The Sixth Labour Government has governed New Zealand since 26 October 2017. It is headed by Chris Hipkins, the Labour Party leader and prime minister.

On 1 August 2017, Jacinda Ardern succeeded Andrew Little as both leader of the Labour Party and Leader of the Opposition. Following the 2017 general election held on 23 September, the New Zealand First party held the balance of power between the sitting centre-right National Party government, and the left bloc of the Labour and Green parties. Following negotiations with the two major parties, New Zealand First leader Winston Peters announced on 19 October 2017 that his party would form a coalition government with Labour. That same day, Green Party leader James Shaw announced that his party would give confidence and supply support to the 55-seat Labour–NZ First government. The Greens' support, plus the coalition, resulted in 63 seats to National's 56—enough to ensure that Ardern maintained the confidence of the House. Three years later, Labour went on to a landslide victory in the 2020 general election with 50% of the vote and 65 seats, an outright majority of the 120 seats in the House.

On 19 January 2023, Ardern announced her resignation and that she would not stand for re-election in the 2023 general election. Hipkins succeeded her as Prime Minister and leader of the Labour Party on 25 January 2023.

History

Formation

The general election on 23 September 2017 saw the New Zealand First party hold the balance of power between National and the centre-left bloc of Labour and the Green Party. Following several weeks of negotiations with both National and Labour, New Zealand First announced on 19 October 2017 it would seek to form a minority coalition government with Labour. Confidence-and-supply support from the Greens, negotiated separately with Labour, enables the Government to have a majority in the House of Representatives. During the coalition-forming negotiations, Labour agreed to drop its proposed water tax on farmers as part of its agreement with New Zealand First. In return, NZ First agreed to drop their demand for referendums on overturning New Zealand's anti-smacking ban and abolishing the Māori electorates. The Greens consented to a confidence and supply agreement with Labour and New Zealand First in return for several concessions, including: a referendum on legalising cannabis, treating alcohol and drugs as a health issue, net zero emissions by 2050 and requiring a climate impact assessment analysis for all legislation

First term (2017–2020)

2017
In November 2017, Prime Minister Jacinda Ardern and Trade and Export Growth Minister David Parker announced that their government would continue participating in the Trans-Pacific Partnership negotiations despite opposition from the Green Party. That same month, Ardern offered to resettle 150 of the asylum seekers from the former Manus Regional Processing Centre in New Zealand, but was rebuffed by the Turnbull Government in Australia. On 20 November, Ardern reaffirmed the Government's commitment to re-enter Pike River Mine with the goal of completing mine recovery by March 2019. Minister for Pike River Re-Entry Andrew Little also announced the creation of the Pike River Recovery Agency.

On 12 December, Education Minister Chris Hipkins announced that the Government would be ending National Standards in schools. This decision was welcomed by the teachers' and principals' unions but opposed by the opposition National and ACT parties. On 20 December, the Government established a Tax Working Group consisting of several academics, businesspeople, and senior civil servants under the leadership of former Finance Minister Michael Cullen with the goal of reforming the taxation system and alleviating the country's housing crisis. On 22 December, Prime Minister Ardern and Foreign Minister Winston Peters opposed US President Donald Trump's move to recognise Jerusalem as the capital of Israel at the United Nations General Assembly and reiterated New Zealand's support for the Two State Solution.

2018
On 19 January 2018, Ardern revealed that she was expecting her first child in June, and that Deputy Prime Minister Winston Peters would serve as Acting Prime Minister while she took maternity leave for a period of six weeks. In mid-February 2018, the Government introduced legislation to stop the creation of new charter schools but to allow the 11 existing schools to continue operating while they negotiated options with the Ministry of Education; with Prime Minister Ardern suggesting that the existing schools could convert to "special character" schools. In early-March 2018, during a state visit to Samoa, Ardern stated that New Zealand would be seeking to shift away from a 'donor, recipient relationship' with Pacific Islands nations in favour of forming partnerships with these states and introduced a NZ$10 million aid package to Samoa with NZ$3 million going to disaster relief following Cyclone Gita and the rest being allocated to social developmental and education projects.

On 8 March 2018, Trade Minister Parker stated the government's intention of ratifying the Comprehensive and Progressive Agreement for Trans-Pacific Partnership, an amended version of the TPP, in Chile. On 3 April 2018, Ardern and Transport Minister Phil Twyford introduced the Government's ten-year draft land transport plan which included a proposed 9-12% a litre fuel tax hike, a proposed 20% fuel tax hike in Auckland, boosting public transport funding by 46%, cutting state highway funding by 11%, and allocating $4 billion over the next ten years to establish rapid transit including light rail with an initial focus on Auckland. On 11 April 2018, Attorney General David Parker announced a government inquiry into allegations that the New Zealand Special Air Service had committed war crimes against Afghan civilians during Operation Burnham while stationed in Afghanistan.

On 11 April, Attorney-General David Parker announced a government inquiry into the New Zealand Special Air Service's actions during Operation Burnham in Afghanistan in August 2010. On 12 April, the government banned future offshore oil and gas exploration in New Zealand. In addition, Energy Minister Megan Woods clarified that the thirty existing exploration permits would still continue and be unaffected by the ban. New Zealand has 27 oil fields with most being located in the Taranaki Basin. The ban on future oil and gas exploration was part of a coalition agreement between the Labour and Green parties. The decision was welcomed by Greens Co-Leader James Shaw, Greenpeace and Forest & Bird but was criticised by the Mayor of New Plymouth Neil Holdom, and the opposition National and ACT parties.

On 19 April, Little entered the Pike River Mine portal with two Pike Family representatives to demonstrate that a safe re-entry was possible. He reiterated the Government's promise to re-enter the drift in order to recover evidence and the remains of the deceased miners. On 4 May, Ardern and Housing Minister Phil Twyford stated that the Government would be investing NZ$100 million into combating homelessness. This initiative included investing NZ$37 million into building 1,500 shorter term-homes and NZ$63 million into the Housing First programme; which involves finding permanent homes for vulnerable families and treating addiction and mental health issues. On 17 May, Finance Minister Grant Robertson released the 2018 New Zealand budget, allocating NZ$2.8 billion in operational funding and NZ$3.8 billion in capital funding to the 2018 New Zealand Budget.

On 11 June, the Labour-led coalition government had abandoned efforts to appeal the Sentencing and Parole Reform Act 2010 (the so-called three-strikes law) due to internal opposition from NZ First. Ardern confirmed that she would temporarily relinquish her duties to Winston Peters, following the birth of her child, for a period of six weeks. Peters became Acting Prime Minister on 20 June 2018, when Ardern went into labour. Her six-week maternity leave concluded on 2 August 2018.

On 1 July 2018, the government announced that it would be implementing its Families Package, which had been signed into law on 15 December 2017. The Families Package would increase paid parental leave from 22 weeks to 26 weeks from July 2020; introduce a Winter Energy Payment for beneficiaries and pensioners; paying $60-a-week to low and middle-income families with babies and toddlers; reinstating the Independent Earner Tax Credit; and increasing benefit allowances for orphans, unsupported children, and foster carers. The Families Package was criticised by the opposition National finance spokesperson Amy Adams for increasing taxation. In response, Finance Minister Grant Robertson countered that the Government was investing in low and middle-income New Zealanders rather than the "top 10% of earners". Meanwhile, Child Poverty Action Group Susan St John said that "the changes were long overdue but did not go far enough".

On 3 July, the New Zealand Educational Institute, the national trade union body for primary teachers, announced that teachers and principals would go on strike on 15 August after the Ministry of Education rejected their demand for a 16% pay rise. On 12 July 2018, 30,000 nurses went on strike for 24 hours; the first such nationwide strike in thirty years. The industrial action came after the New Zealand Nurses Organisation rejected the government's offer of a 12.5% pay rise. A few days earlier, 4,000 workers at Inland Revenue and the Ministry of Business, Innovation and Employment stopped work for two hours to protest their salaries, their first industrial action in 22 years. On 7 August, nurses voted to accept an offer by DHBs that included pay rises between 12% and 16%, an earlier new pay step for senior nurses, the implementation of Capacity Demand Management (CCDM); and a commitment to pay equity by the end of next year.

On 14 August, the Government passed the Overseas Investment Amendment Act 2018 which bans the sale of existing homes to non-residents as a means of easing the housing shortage in New Zealand. Australians and Singaporean nationals were made exempt from this ban due to free trade rules. The Bill was supported by Labour and its coalition partners New Zealand First and the Greens but was opposed by the opposition National and ACT parties. It passed its third reading on 14 August by 63 votes to 57 votes.

On 30 August 2018, Civil Defence Minister Kris Faafoi announced that the Government was investing into supporting "rapid response teams" in emergencies following a critical Ministerial Technical Advisory Group's (TAG) review of the Government's unsatisfactory responses to the 2016 Kaikoura earthquake and the 2017 Port Hills fires.

By September 2018, all twelve existing charter schools had been successfully converted into state integrated and special character schools. In early October 2018, the Government formally established a new government department called the Ministry of Housing and Urban Development to manage housing and urban development issues. This department is headed by Minister of Housing and Urban Development Phil Twyford.

In late November 2018, Prime Minister Ardern and Health Minister David Clark announced that the Government would reduce the costs of visits to the general practitioner as part of their Budget 2018. These policies include extending free doctors' visits to resident children under the age of thirteen and lowering Community Service Card holders' fees by $20-$30 per visit.

On 11 December 2018, the Government passed a law, amending the Misuse of Drugs Act 1975 to allow terminally ill patients to use marijuana for palliative care. The new law was supported by all coalition parties but was opposed by the opposition National Party, which argued that it would legalise recreational cannabis consumption. On 18 December, the Government announced that it would be holding a binding referendum on legalising the personal use of cannabis during the 2020 general election.

On 19 December, the Government announced that it would be voting in favour of the UN's Global Compact for Migration. Foreign Minister Peters justified the decision on the grounds the Compact was not legally binding and would not hinder New Zealand from setting its own migration policies. The Government's decision was criticised by the opposition National Party, which claimed it would violate New Zealand's sovereignty.

2019
In mid-January 2019, Minister of Housing and Urban Development Phil Twyford admitted that the government would be unable to meet its target of building 1,000 KiwiBuild homes by 1 July, with only 33 homes being built as of 23 January. The minister estimated that the government would be able to build only 300 houses by the 1 July deadline. That same month, it was reported that the KiwiBuild Head Stephen Barclay had resigned following disagreements with the Housing Minister and criticism from Housing and Urban Development employees over his leadership and management. Barclay announced that he was filing a "constructive dismissal case" against the ministry for breaching his privacy.

On 3 February 2019, Prime Minister Ardern and Regional Economic Development Minister Shane Jones announced that the government had allocated NZ$100 million from its Provincial Growth Fund to supporting Māori economic development by providing access capital. It also allocated another NZ$27 million to improving transportation and the horticulture sector around Kaipara District.

In mid-February, Education Minister Chris Hipkins proposed merging the country's sixteen polytechnics into a "NZ Institute of Skills and Technology" in response to deficits and a slump in domestic enrolments. This proposed NZ Institute would also take over the enrolment and management of apprentices and industry trainees from the country's eleven industry training organisations. In addition, the government will create a new vocational funding system. The Tertiary Education Union, Employers and Manufacturers Union, and the Canterbury Employers' Chamber of Commerce have expressed tentative support for the government's proposals. However, the opposition National Party's Education spokesperson Shane Reti criticised the proposed merger, claiming that it would entail the centralisation of decision-marking in the vocational education sector. In response to the Christchurch mosque shootings on 15 March 2019, Hipkins extended the polytechnic submission timeframe to 5 April 2019.

On 5 March 2019, the New Zealand Parliament unanimously passed the Crimes Amendment Bill, which repealed Section 123 of the Crimes Act. This bill had been introduced the previous year by Minister of Justice Andrew Little and sought to overturn the law banning the publication of any "blasphemous libel" in New Zealand. The amendment received support from both government and opposition parties as well as the Ministry of Justice, the Human Rights Commission, and the New Zealand Council of Civil Liberties. 
The bill received the royal assent on 11 March 2019 and came into force the following day.

Following the Christchurch mosque shootings on 15 March 2019, Prime Minister Ardern announced that the government would be reforming New Zealand's gun laws, including a proposed ban on semi-automatic firearms. Attorney General David Parker said that the government would consider legislation dealing with semi-automatic weapons and other issues. On 21 March 2019, Ardern announced that the government would ban all semi-automatic firearms and assault rifles. She also clarified that the government would be introducing a buy-back scheme to remove all prohibited firearms from circulation.

On 10 April, the government's Arms (Prohibited Firearms, Magazines, and Parts) Amendment Act 2019 passed its third reading, banning semi-automatic firearms, magazines, and parts. The Arms Amendment Act 2019 was supported by all parties except the opposition ACT Party's sole MP David Seymour. In addition, the government announced an amnesty and buy-back scheme for prohibited firearms and components.

On 17 April, Prime Minister Ardern announced that it would not be introducing a capital gains tax, citing disagreements among coalition parties over implementing such a tax. The Prime Minister pledged that under her leadership capital gains tax would not be introduced in the future. Finance Minister Robertson said that the Government would still explore options for targeting land speculation, land banking, and vacant land. Opposition Leader Bridges criticised the capital gains tax debate for wasting taxpayer funds and undermining business and investor confidence.

On 2 May 2019, Education Minister Hipkins announced that the Government would be investing NZ$95 million to train 2,400 new teacher trainees through increased scholarships and placements, new employment-based teacher education programmes, and iwi-based scholarships over the next four years to address the teaching shortage. Post Primary Teachers' Association President Jack Boyle responded that the Government's measures were insufficient to deal with the teachers shortage, which he attributed to insufficient salaries, high workloads, and a high attrition rate among new teaching graduates. National Party Education spokesperson Nikki Kaye claimed that the Government's spending would not address the teaching shortage while ACT MP David Seymour opined that the money would be better spent on increasing teaching salaries.

On 8 May 2019, the Government introduced the Climate Change Response (Zero Carbon) Amendment Bill to Parliament. The Government's Zero Carbon Bill passed its first reading on 22 May 2019. The opposition National Party supported the bill despite its concerns about the bill's methane targets.

On 21 May 2019, mine re-entry efforts into the Pike River Mine began. Recovery and forensic operations are expected to take several months.

On 30 May 2019, the Government released its first Wellbeing Budget. Key provisions included creating a new frontline mental health service, investing $40 million in suicide prevention services, stationing nurses at secondary schools, building 1,044 new homes, investing $320 million into specialist services to address family and sexual violence, investing $200 million into apprenticeships and vocational training programs, investing $1 billion into KiwiRail, and investing $1.7 billion and $1.2 billion into repairing hospitals and schools respectively. The release of the Wellbeing Budget was complicated by the accidental publication two days earlier of high-level documents on a test website that was not supposed to be publicly available. The opposition National Party gained access to these documents and criticised the budget. This leak initially raised allegations of hacking and was referred to the police before a senior Treasury official confirmed that the leak had been accidental. Opposition Leader Bridges also criticised the Government's handling of the data leak and called for the resignations of Finance Minister Grant Robertson and Treasury Secretary Gabriel Makhlouf.

On 10 June 2019, Prime Minister Ardern, Foreign Minister Peters, and Defence Minister Ron Mark announced that the New Zealand Government would be withdrawing New Zealand military forces from Iraq in June 2020.  The New Zealand Defence Force had dispatched a non-combat Building Partner Capacity (BPC) training mission to help Australian forces train Iraqi Security Forces at the Taji Military Complex in Iraq in support of the US-led coalition efforts to combat Islamic State forces in Iraq. The number of NZ military personnel would be reduced from 95 to 75 by July 2019, and 45 from January 2020. However, NZDF personnel would remain in Afghanistan for at least another 18 months. Prime Minister Ardern also announced that the number of NZDF personnel in Afghanistan would be reduced from 13 to 11 by March 2020. While National has cautiously supported the Government's policy, the party's defence spokesperson Mark Mitchell has voiced concerns that the Iraqi withdrawal was too soon.

On 11 June 2019, Defence Minister Mark released the Government's $20 billion Defence Capability Plan 2019, which will cover the NZ Defence Force's budget for the next eleven years. Key items include investing NZ$3.5 billion for new and replacement naval vessels and maritime helicopters, NZ$2.5 billion worth of upgrades for the Royal New Zealand Air Force, bolstering New Zealand Army troop numbers from 4,700 to 6,000 by 2035, and launching satellite-based surveillance systems. National's defence spokesperson Mitchell has supported the Government's Defence Capability Plan but disagreed with the Government's decision to bypass the tender process for new Lockheed C-130 Hercules jets.

On 20 June, Finance Minister Robertson and Police Minister Nash launched the Government's six-month firearms buy-back amnesty, which would run until 20 December. The Government allocated NZ$200 million to the firearms buy-back scheme. Licensed firearms owners will be eligible for the scheme. There are four collection options for the government's buy-back scheme: large-scale events at centralised community locations; handing over items at approved gun dealers; bulk pick-ups by Police; and at Police stations.

On 26 June 2019, the primary teachers' union, the New Zealand Educational Institute, voted to accept the Government's NZ$1.5 billion collective agreement. This collective agreement contains a new, unified pay scale that will restore parity across the state schooling sector. Key provisions include raising all teachers' base salaries by 18.5% by July 2021 and making Q3+, Q4, and Q5 teachers eligible for a new top salary of NZ$90,000. While primary teachers voted to accept the Government's offer, primary principals have rejected the offer, demanding better pay and working conditions. On 28 June 2019, the secondary teachers' union, the Post Primary Teachers' Association, voted by a majority of 65% to accept the Government's pay offer, which included a lump sum of NZ$1,500 and a 3% pay rise in July and over the next three years.

On 27 June 2019, Prime Minister Ardern announced a cabinet reshuffle. She split the housing portfolio into three positions; appointing Megan Woods as Minister of Housing, Kris Faafoi as Associate Minister of Housing, and Phil Twyford as Minister of Urban Development. In addition, Grant Robertson was appointed as Minister Responsible for the Earthquake Commission; Jenny Salesa as Minister of Customs; and Peeni Henare became Minister of Civil Defence. In addition, several Labour Members of Parliament were appointed to various parliamentary positions including assistant speaker, senior government whip, and parliamentary private secretaries.

On 17 July, the Government released its plan on integrating drones into the country's transportation system, entitled Taking Flight: an aviation system for the automated age. Transportation Minister Phil Twyford said that drones "could deliver economic benefits by doing tasks that are time intensive, expensive, and risky – such as monitoring crops, inspecting power lines and helping with emergency operations". As of 2019, there are 77,000 drones in New Zealand with many being used in the forestry, agriculture, and conservation sectors.

On 22 July, Prime Minister Ardern announced a second series of gun reforms which including creating a national firearms register, tighter restrictions on who can obtain a firearms licence, and a ban on overseas visitors buying guns in New Zealand but still allowing them to bring personal firearms into the country. Police Minister Stuart Nash announced that the Government would be drafting a new bill the following month to codify these proposed reforms into law. The New Zealand Police's union, the Police Association, has advocated the establishment of a national gun register and welcomed the government's proposed raft of gun reforms.

On 26 July, the New Zealand Educational Institute's kindergarten teacher members voted to accept an agreement with the Ministry of Education that will put early childhood education teachers' pay on par with primary and secondary school teachers. Early childhood education teachers will receive a pay rise of at least 18.5% by July 2020, NZEI members will receive a lump sum of NZ$1,500, and there will be an increase in the head and senior teachers' allowances.

On 1 August, the Education Minister Chris Hipkins announced that the Government would merge all 16 institutes of technology and polytechnics (ITPs) into a single entity in April 2020. In addition, Hipkins announced that the Government would replace all 11 industrial training organisations (ITOs) with between four and seven workforce development councils that would be set up by 2022 to influence vocational education and training. While polytechnics have been cautiously optimistic about the changes despite concerns about losing their autonomy to a national organisation, ITOs have opposed these changes, arguing that they would wreak an already working system. National's tertiary education spokesperson Shane Reti criticised the proposed changes as a "step backward" that would lead to job losses.

On 4 August, Prime Minister Ardern announced that the Government would be investing NZ$25 million in purchasing 12 new radiation machines over the next three years.  Funding for this will come from the $1.7 billion the Government invested in hospital and health facilities as part of its Wellbeing Budget.

On 5 August, Justice Minister Andrew Little announced a new abortion reform law that would remove abortion from the Crimes Act 1961 and allow women unrestricted access to abortion within the 20 week gestation period. Other changes include allowing women to self-refer to an abortion service, ensuring that health practitioners advise women about counselling services, establishing safe areas around abortion facilities, and requiring conscientious objecting doctors to inform women about their stance and alternative services. Despite initially ruling out a referendum, Labour's coalition partner New Zealand First has since supported calls for a referendum on abortion reform. National Party leader Simon Bridges has indicated that he would support a Select Committee considering the bill. On 8 August, the Government's abortion reform bill passed its first reading by 94 to 23 votes. Politicians followed a conscience vote instead of voting according to party lines.

In mid August 2019, the Associate Housing Minister Kris Faafoi and Social Development Minister Carmel Sepuloni announced that the Government would be launching a NZ$54 million program to tackle homelessness in New Zealand. This includes investing $31 million in recruiting 67 intensive case managers and navigators to work with homeless people and a further $16 million in the Sustaining Tenancies Programme. This funding complements the Government's Housing First programme. On 29 August, Prime Minister Ardern and Children's Minister Martin announced that the Government will be launching a free lunch program. The trial program will begin with 5,000 primary and intermediate-aged school pupils at 30 schools in Rotorua and Hawke's Bay with plans to extend it to 21,000 pupils in 120 schools by early 2021.

On 30 August, the Minister for Women Julie Anne Genter announced the establishment of a National Health Coordination Centre in Auckland in response to a measles outbreak. As of 30 August, there were 759 reported cases of measles in Auckland, 41 in the Canterbury Region, and four in the Otago and Southland regions. On 1 September, Prime Minister Ardern and Health Minister Clark announced that it would create a national Cancer Control Agency by December 2019 and would also invest NZ$60 million into the national drug purchasing company Pharmac as part of a ten-year cancer action plan.

On 4 September, Housing Minister Megan Woods announced that the Government was revising its KiwiBuild programme, admitting that the initial goal had been "overly ambitious" and that houses had been built in places with little demand. Changes have included scrapping its target to build 100,000 houses over the next ten years, reducing government-back deposits for housing loans from 10% to 5%, and introducing progressive home ownership schemes including shared ownership and rent to buy initiatives.

On 10 September, Prime Minister Ardern and Health Minister Clark announced the establishment of a Suicide Prevention Office to address the country's suicide rate. Key changes include shifting from a mental health service model to a community-based one and supporting people bereaved by suicide. The Suicide Prevention Office will initially be under the oversight of the Ministry of Health but there are plans to make it a standalone government service.

On 12 September, Prime Minister Ardern announced that the teaching of New Zealand history will be made compulsory in all New Zealand primary and secondary schools by 2022. Key topics include the arrival of Māori people, European colonisation, the Treaty of Waitangi, immigration to New Zealand, the country's evolving national identity during the 19th and 20th centuries, and New Zealand's involvement in the Pacific. Education Minister Hipkins also confirmed that the Education Ministry would work with historical and curriculum experts, the Māori and Pacific communities, students, parents, and other interested parties. Historically, the teaching of New Zealand history has been neglected in schools in favor of European history. Hokotehi Moriori Trust chair Maui Solomon welcomed the Government's announcement, saying that it would help dispel myths about the Moriori being a separate Melanesian people who were displaced by the Māori.

On 13 September 2019, Prime Minister Ardern and Police Minister Nash announced that the Government would be introducing an Arms Legislation Bill in late September. The new bill would introduce an online firearms register to stop the flow of guns into the criminal underworld. The opposition National Party, which had seen a leaked draft of the bill the previous month, and gun lobby groups claimed that the bill would hurt firearm owners and gun clubs. The Government's Arms Legislation Bill passed its first reading. Labour, the Greens, and NZ First supported the bill but it was opposed by the National and ACT parties.

In early October 2019, Immigration Minister Iain Lees-Galloway announced that the Government would be scrapping a requirement for African and Middle Eastern refugee applicants to have relatives who were residing in New Zealand. Despite increasing the African and Middle Eastern refugee quotas from 14% to 15%, New Zealand's refugee resettlement program would still focus on resettling refugees from the Asia-Pacific region, which is allocated 50% on the annual refugee quota. Refugee advocate Murdoch Stephens, World Vision, and the Race Relations Commissioner Meng Foon had previously criticized the previous policy as discriminatory.

On 8 October 2019, the New Zealand Treasury and Finance Minister Robertson released a report stating that the Government's surplus had increased from NZ$2 billion to NZ$7.5 billion. The net Government debt had also fallen to 19.2% of Gross Domestic Product (GDP), which is still short of its self-imposed Budget Responsibility Rules to keep debt at less than 20% of GDP. The total government revenue also increased from NZ$6.2 billion to NZ$86.5 billion as a result of taxation. However, the total district health board deficit rose to NZ$1 billion while the net Crown debt rose by 0.2% from NZ$57.5 billion in the 2017-2018 financial year to NZ$57.7 billion in 2019. In response, National's Economic development spokesman Todd McClay claimed that the Government was not investing enough money in taxpayers and highlighted declining business confidence.

On 23 October 2019, parliament, which had debated the End of Life Choice Bill, voted 63 votes to 57 to have the issue of euthanasia decided by a referendum at the next election. New Zealand First's members had stated that they would vote against the legislation as a block if the proposal to hold a referendum was rejected. On 13 November, the End of Life Choice Bill passed its third and final reading.

In later October 2019, the Regional Development Minister Shane Jones announced that the Government would be investing NZ$20 million into re-establishing Hillside Engineering in South Dunedin as a major heavy engineering and KiwiRail servicing hub. Hillside Engineering's operations had been wound down in 2012 due to the previous National Government's decision to buy train components from China.

In early November 2019, New Zealand and China agreed to upgrade their free trade agreement. China has agreed to ease restrictions on New Zealand imports, commit to environmental standards and give NZ preferential access to its wood and paper trade. In return, New Zealand has agreed to ease visa restrictions for Chinese tour guides and Chinese language teachers.

On 6 November 2019, the Government reversed a controversial decision by Immigration New Zealand to exclude non-resident Indian arranged marriages from the partnership visa program. Immigration NZ's earlier decision to tighten their partnership visa rules had drawn allegations of racism from the New Zealand Indian community.

On 7 November 2019, the Government's Climate Change Response (Zero Carbon) Amendment Bill passed its third reading with the near-unanimous support of most parties excluding the ACT Party. The opposition National Party supported the bill's passages into law despite some disagreements with the Government.

On 18 November, Associate Housing Minister Kris Faafoi announced that the Government would be amending the Residential Tenancies Act 1986. Proposed changes have included limited rent increases to once every twelve months, banning rental bidding, ending "no cause" evictions, extending the notice period that landlords have to give tenants for selling rental property from 42 days to 63–90 days, and letting tenants make minor fittings, and anonymising complaints to the tenancy tribunal. Andrew King of the NZ Property Investors Federation and National Party leader Simon Bridges claimed that these changes would make it more difficult to evict "troublesome" tenants and would do little to address the housing shortage. By contrast, the Green Party and tenancy advocacy group Renters United have welcomed these changes as a win for tenants' rights.

On 23 November 2019, the Justice Minister Andrew Little announced that the Government would be amending the Electoral Amendment Bill to allow prisoners who had been sentenced to less than three years in prison to vote in time for the 2020 New Zealand general election; reversing the Fifth National Government's decision to strip all prisoners of their voting rights in 2010. Little argued that restoring prisoners' voting rights would aid their reintegration into society. The Government's policy shift had been preceded by a successful legal challenge mounted by prisoners advocate Arthur William Taylor in 2013 and a Waitangi Tribunal report that the voting ban on prisoners disproportionately affected Māori prisoners. While Little's announcement was welcomed by Green MP Ghahraman, National Party leader Bridges accused the Government of being "soft on crime."

On 28 November 2019, Prime Minister Ardern marked the 40th anniversary of the Erebus air disaster by apologizing on behalf of the Government and national carrier Air New Zealand to the families of the victims.

In early December 2019, Justice Minister Little announced that the Government would be introducing legislation to ban foreign donations over the amount of NZ$50 in a move to combat foreign interference in New Zealand elections. This policy would put New Zealand in line with Australia, Canada, and the United Kingdom, which have introduced similar electoral financing legislation.

In early December, the Education Minister Chris Hipkins introduced the Education and Training Bill 2019. This omnibus bill aims to loosen restrictions on teachers using force, make religious instruction optional, and focus more on the Treaty of Waitangi. The bill passed its first reading with the support of Labour and its coalition partners NZ First and the Greens but was opposed by the National and ACT parties. In addition, Prime Minister Ardern announced that the Government would be investing NZ$400 million in school property upgrades, with each school being allocated between NZ$50,000 and NZ$400,000 depending on their school roll.

On 18 December, Workplace Relations and Safety Minister Iain Lees-Galloway announced that the Government would be raising the minimum wage to NZ$18.90 an hour from April 2020, a $1.20 increase from $17.70. This news was welcomed by the Council of Trade Unions and E-Tu unions but was criticised by the opposition National Party's Workplace Relations and Safety spokesperson Todd McClay, who claimed that a wage hike would cost jobs and increase costs on small businesses.

2020
In response to the 2019–20 Australian bushfire season, the New Zealand Government dispatched 179 firefighters, medical personnel, and elements of the Royal New Zealand Air Force and New Zealand Army to assist with firefighting efforts.

On 12 January 2020, the Government announced that the Ministry of Education would be introducing climate change education into the educational curriculum for students aged between 11 and 15 years. These new resources would include lessons about climate change mitigation, activism, and combating climate skepticism. The Government's climate change teaching resource was criticized by Federated Farmers, and the opposition National and New Conservative parties. Federated Farmers also organized a petition calling on the Government to withdraw the climate change material from the Education Ministry's website. National indicated that they would withdraw the material from the education system if elected. By contrast, left-wing blogger Martyn "Bomber" Bradbury claimed that the climate change curriculum did not go far enough in pursuing "polluters."

On 13 January, Education Minister Hipkins also announced that parents would be required to give explicit written permission for their children to receive religious instruction in schools. While the New Zealand education system is secular, several Christian groups including the Churches Education Commission have provided Bible lessons in primary schools under a provision of the Education Act that allows state schools to hold religious education classes for up to 20 hours a year. This has been opposed by the secular advocacy group Secular Education Network.

On 28 January, Prime Minister Ardern announced that the 2020 New Zealand general election would be held on 19 September 2020.

In late January 2020, Broadcasting Minister Kris Faafoi announced that the Government was planning to merge TVNZ and Radio New Zealand into a new public broadcasting service. In response, the opposition National Party's Broadcasting spokesperson Melissa Lee and Opposition Leader Bridges announced that it would oppose any plans to merge Radio NZ and TVNZ.

On 29 January, the Government announced the New Zealand Upgrade Programme, a $12 billion infrastructure package focusing on highway upgrades and rail improvements with some spending on health and education.

In late January, the Government announced that they would be chartering a Boeing 777-200ER plane from the national carrier Air New Zealand to assist in the evacuations efforts of New Zealand, Australian, and Pacific Island nationals from Wuhan in response to the COVID-19 pandemic. On 2 February, the Government imposed a temporary travel ban on all foreign nationals traveling from or transiting through mainland China in response to the coronavirus outbreak, which came into effect on 2 February.  New Zealand citizens and permanent residents, and their immediate family members, were allowed to enter New Zealand, but must self-isolate for 14 days.

In mid-February, the Government announced that they would be investing NZ$300 million into the Aotearoa New Zealand Homelessness Action Plan to combat homeless including creating an extra 1,000 transitional housing places and investing $70 million into homelessness prevention programmes. In late February, Prime Minister Ardern announced that the Government would be contributing NZ$2 million to Fiji's climate change relocation fund to help people displaced by climate change. This is part of the Government's NZ$150 million climate change aid package for the Pacific Islands.

On 28 February, the Government imposed a temporary travel ban on travelers from Iran in response to the coronavirus outbreak. While New Zealand citizens and permanent residents will be allowed to return, they must self-isolate for 14 days. In addition, Health Minister David Clark announced that no exemptions would be made for Chinese international students to re-enter the country and that there would be an increased health presence at airports. That same day, Ardern confirmed New Zealand's first case of the coronavirus outbreak, an individual who had returned from Iran earlier in the week.

On 2 March, the Government extended travel restrictions on Iran and China by seven days. In addition, travelers arriving from northern Italy and South Korea will be required to self-isolate for 14 days. On 4 March, Ardern confirmed New Zealand's second case of the coronavirus, an individual who had returned from Italy with her family.

On 6 March, Police Minister Stuart Nash announced that the Government would be investing NZ$1.9 million from the Proceeds of Crime Fund into installing hundreds of new fog cannons at dairies across New Zealand in order to combat robberies. On 9 March, Prime Minister Ardern appointed Andrew Coster as the new Commissioner of Police, replacing Mike Bush who will step down after two terms in April 2020.

On 14 March, Ardern announced in response to the coronavirus epidemic that the government would be requiring anyone entering New Zealand from midnight 15 March to isolate themselves for 14 days. The Government also placed a temporary entry ban on all cruise ships until 30 June 2020, which came into effect at midnight on 14 March. In addition, the government imposed restrictions on travelers heading to the Pacific Islands, excluding anyone with coronavirus symptoms from traveling there and requiring those who have been traveling overseas prior to isolate for 14 days before traveling to the Pacific. The government also canceled anniversary memorial services for the 2019 Christchurch mosque shootings due to coronavirus concerns.

On 17 March, Finance Minister Grant Robertson announced a NZ$12.1 billion business package in response to the coronavirus pandemic. This includes $8.7 billion for businesses and jobs, $2.8 billion for income support, and $500 million for health. As part of the package, the government also invested $126 million in COVID-19 leave and self-isolation support and $600 million into a support package for national carrier Air New Zealand.

On 19 March, Ardern announced that borders would be closed to all non New Zealand citizens and residents, beginning at midnight NZDT. The only categories exempted from the ban were Samoan and Tongan citizens traveling to New Zealand for essential reasons, "essential health workers", and those seeking to enter the country for humanitarian reasons.

On 21 March, Ardern introduced a COVID-19 alert level system after health authorities confirmed 13 new cases, bringing the total to 52. As a result of a level 2 ranking, people over the age of 70 or with compromised immune systems were encouraged to stay at home, and all non-essential domestic travel was curtailed.

On 22 March, Associate Health and Whānau Ora Minister Peeni Henare announced that the Government would be investing NZ$56.4 million in assistance for Māori communities and businesses affected by the coronavirus pandemic.

On 23 March, Ardern raised the COVID-19 alert level to level 3 after health authorities confirmed 36 new cases, bringing the total to 102. As a result, all mass gatherings including schools were cancelled. She also announced that the government would upgrade the national alert level to level 4 on 11:59 pm on 25 March, which would lead to a nationwide lockdown for at least four weeks. All sporting matches and events as well as non-essential services such as pools, bars, cafes, restaurants, playgrounds were closed, while essential services such as supermarkets, petrol stations, and health services remained open. The government announced a list of "essential services" that would continue to function during the four-week lockdown period which came into effect from 26 March.

On 24 March, the government announced that parliament would adjourn for five weeks beginning on 27 March. Prior to the parliament's closure, it passed three bills with cross-party support dealing with emergency spending, remitting interest on tax owed after 14 February, allowing local authorities to meet remotely, governments to take over schools, and preventing no-cause evictions and freezing rent for six months. That same day, Finance Minister Grant Robertson also announced that the government was negotiating with banks to ensure that nobody would lose their homes as a result of defaulting on mortgage payments during the pandemic.

On 25 March, it was announced that Leader of the Opposition Simon Bridges would chair a cross-party committee called the Epidemic Response Committee to scrutinise the government's response to COVID-19. Two thirds of members will be from the opposition National while the remainder will come from the Labour, New Zealand First and Green parties. Other members include New Zealand First MP Fletcher Tabuteau, Greens co-leader Marama Davidson, and ACT leader David Seymour.

On 26 March, Ardern announced that the government would provide $27 million to social service providers such as the Salvation Army and Women's Refuge to help the vulnerable cope with the lockdown. In addition, Finance Minister Grant Robertson also announced that the government had given NZ$1.5 billion to more than 240,000 workers as part of its wage subsidy scheme in response to the coronavirus pandemic.

On 8 April, Ardern and Education Minister Chris Hipkins announced that the government was investing in a NZ$87.7 million distance learning package to facilitate education during the lockdown period. This distance learning package including two education television channels (one English and the other Māori), improved Internet access and devices, online resources for parents, handheld devices, and educational material for different year levels.

On 14 April, the New Zealand Government announced a NZ$130 million support package for tertiary students including raising the amount of course related costs able to be claimed per student for the year to 
NZ$2,000 temporarily, continuing support payments for students unable to study online for up to eight weeks, and ensuring that students whose studies have been disrupted by the COVID-19 pandemic's eligibility for student loans and Fees Free study would not be affected.

On 15 April, Prime Minister Ardern announced that all government ministers and public sector chief executives would take a 20 percent pay cut in response to the coronavirus pandemic. Opposition Leader Simon Bridges has also confirmed that he will take a 20 percent pay cut.

On 20 April, Prime Minister Ardern extended New Zealand's Alert Level 4 by another seven days, arguing that the country needed to consolidate the gains  made in containing the spread of the coronavirus. The Alert Level 4 will end at 11:59 pm on 27 April with the country entering into Alert Level 3 on 28 April. Ardern also announced that schools and early childhood centres could reopen on 29 April.

On 23 April, Broadcasting Minister Kris Faafoi announced the Government's NZ$50 million media release package which includes $20.5 million to eliminate broadcasting transmission fee for six months; $16.5 million to reduce media organisations' contribution fees to New Zealand On Air for the 2020/21 financial year; $11.1 million in specific targeted assistance to companies; $1.3 million to purchase central government news media subscriptions; and $600,000 to completely cut Radio New Zealand's AM transmission fees for six months. Faafoi also confirmed that the proposed TVNZ–Radio New Zealand merger had been suspended as a result of the economic fallout of the coronavirus pandemic.

On 1 May the Government, with the unanimous support of all parliamentary parties, passed a NZ$23 billion omnibus tax support package to support New Zealand businesses affected by the ongoing coronavirus pandemic. This bill's provisions included a NZ$3 billion tax relief package for businesses, NZ$25 million for further business support in 2021, a $NZ10 billion wage subsidy scheme, NZ$4.27 billion to support 160,000 small businesses, and NZ$1.3 billion for 8,900 medium-sized businesses.

On 5 May, Prime Minister Ardern attended the Australian Emergency Cabinet via video conference alongside Australian Prime Minister Scott Morrison and several Australian state and territorial leaders. The NZ and Australian Governments agreed to work together develop a trans-Tasman COVID-safe travel zone that would allow residents from both countries to travel freely without travel restrictions as part of efforts to ease coronavirus restrictions.

On 11 May Prime Minister Ardern announced that New Zealand would be entering alert level 2 at 11:59 pm on 13 May. While most lockdown restrictions would be lifted, there would still be restrictions on social distancing in public while private gatherings such as funerals, tangi, weddings, and religious services would be limited to ten people. Schools can reopen on Monday 18 May, while bars (defined as on-licence premises which primarily serve beverages) can reopen on 21 May. The Government will look at lifting the limit on public gatherings without physical distancing on 25 May.

On 13 May, the Government passed the COVID-19 Public Health Response Act 2020 which gave police the power to enter homes in order to enforce lockdown restrictions without a warrant. This bill was opposed by the opposition National and ACT parties, and criticised by the Human Rights Commission. In addition, Civil Defence Minister Peeni Henare lifted the national state of emergency. Health Minister David Clark also announced changes to the alert level 2 rating, allowing up to 50 people to attend funerals and tangihanga. Education Minister Chris Hipkins has also moved the National Certificate of Educational Achievement (NCEA) high school exams from 6 November to 16 November.

On 14 May, Finance Minister Grant Roberson released the 2020 budget. Its provisions include a NZ$50 billion COVID-19 Response and Recovery Fund, a NZ$3.2 billion wage subsidy scheme, business support, trades training support, a NZ$1.1 billion environmental jobs package, investing $900 million to supporting the Māori community, and extending the school lunch programme.

On 20 May, the Government released a COVID-19 contact tracing app called the NZ COVID Tracer.

On 25 May, Prime Minister Ardern raised the limits on social gatherings including religious services, weddings, and funerals to 100, which comes into effect at 12pm on 29 May 2020. Ardern also confirmed that Cabinet would consider a decision to move into alert level 1 on 8 June, with 22 June set as the tentative date for moving into alert level 1. That same day, Finance Minister Robertson introduced a new 12-week relief payment scheme for New Zealand citizens and residents who lost their jobs as a result of the COVID-19 pandemic, which comes into effect on 8 June. It pays NZ$490 per week for those who lost full-time work and NZ$250 for part time workers including students.

On 3 June, Prime Minister Ardern announced that the Government would make a decision to enter Alert Level 1 on 8 June. She clarified that Alert level 1 would involve the elimination of social distancing restrictions on shops, restaurants, public transportation and public gatherings including religious services, funerals, weddings, and community sports events. However, event organisers would have to ensure contact tracing. That same day, National alleged that a leaked cabinet paper suggested that New Zealand could move into Alert level 1 straight away. The Government contended that the paper represented "one strand" of decision making and that any move into alert level 1 was predicated upon eliminating the chains of transmissions and ensure there were no new community transmissions for at least 28 days. That same day, Prime Minister Ardern announced that the Government would be distributing free sanitary products in 15 Waikato high schools on a trial basis as part of a NZ$2.6 million initiative to combat "period poverty."

On 18 June 2020, the Government's Arms Legislation Bill 2019 passed into law. New Zealand First agreed to support the bill's passage in return for the establishment of an independent entity that would take over firearms licensing and administration from the police. In addition, the amended Bill also allowed members of the farming community, owners and managers of agricultural businesses to apply for endorsements to use prohibited firearms for pest control without having to establish a company to carry out the work.

On 19 June 2020, Housing Minister Megan Woods was given joint responsibility with Air Commodore Darryn Webb for supervising isolation and quarantine facilities for travellers entering New Zealand, as part of the  Government's response to the COVID-19 pandemic.

On 24 June, Transport Minister Phil Twyford abandoned its flagship Auckland Light Rail project due to disagreements between Labour and its coalition partner New Zealand First. The Auckland Light Rail sought to connect the Auckland CBD with Auckland Airport in Auckland's southern Manukau suburb. Mayor of Auckland Phil Goff expressed disappointment while National's Transport spokesperson Chris Bishop listed the abandonment of Auckland Light Rail as one of the Government's failures.

On 24 June, the Government's Electoral (Registration of Sentenced Prisoners) Amendment Bill passed with the support of the Labour, New Zealand First, and Green parties. National, ACT, and Jami-Lee Ross opposed the bill. The Bill allowed prisoners serving sentences of less than three years to vote. In addition, it incorporated an amendment supported by both the Greens and National which eliminates the Electoral Commission's power to remove voters from the electoral roll. It also advises prisoners serving any sentence of their right to register to vote but that their disqualification would remain if they were serving more than three years. Justice Minister Little accused National of sabotaging the bill and announced that this change to the bill would be corrected.

On 29 June, Health Minister David Clark announced that the Government was investing NZ$150 million in personal protective equipment from their NZ$50 billion COVID-19 Response and Recovery Fund unveiled in the 2020 New Zealand budget. In addition, returnees in isolation facilities are required to wear face masks.

On 2 July, Health Minister Clark resigned from his portfolio, stating that he "had become a distraction from the Government's ongoing response to the COVID-19 pandemic and health reforms." Following Clark's resignation, Prime Minister Ardern appointed Chris Hipkins as interim Health Minister until the general elections in September 2020.

On 7 July, the Immigration Minister Iain Lees-Galloway extended the visas of 16,500 Essential Skills and Work to Residence workers by six months and the 12-month stand-down period for 600 migrant workers including dairy workers until February 2021.

On 21 July, Health Minister Chris Hipkins announced that the Government would be investing NZ$302 million into various health services including NZ$150 million over two years for Pharmac, NZ$30 million into the National Close Contact Service, NZ$23 million into a National Immunisation Solution, NZ$35 million for purchasing more ventilators and respiratory equipment, NZ$50 million for purchasing personal protective equipment supplies, and NZ$14.6 million for telehealth services.

On 22 July, Prime Minister Ardern dismissed Iain Lees-Galloway from his Immigration, Workplace Relations and Accident Compensation Corporation (ACC) ministerial portfolios after he admitted having an inappropriate relationship with a former staff member who worked at one of his agencies. Following his resignation, Kris Faafoi became Minister of Immigration while Andrew Little became Minister for Workplace Relations and Safety, and Carmel Sepuloni became Minister for ACC.

On 28 July, the Government suspended New Zealand's extradition treaty with Hong Kong in response to the Chinese Government's Hong Kong national security law introduced earlier that month. Foreign Minister Peters criticized the new law for "eroding rule-of-law principles" and undermining the "one country, two systems" policy while Prime Minister Ardern criticised the new law for violating the principles of freedom of association and the right to take a political view. In response, the Chinese Embassy criticised the New Zealand Government for violating international law and norms, and interfering in China's internal affairs.

On 29 July, Housing Minister Megan Woods announced that New Zealanders entering the country temporarily and most temporary visa holders with the exception of family members of citizens who were not liable, diplomats, or those here for the Christchurch mosque trial would have to pay for their 14-day stay in managed isolation.  The isolation stays will cost NZ$3,100 ($2,050) for the first adult in each hotel room, $950 for each additional adult and $475 for each child sharing the room. However, New Zealanders returning home permanently will be exempt from these charges. While the Labour and Green parties supported the new ruling, New Zealand First and the opposition National party argued that the charges would apply to all travellers entering the country.

On 5 August, the Government passed the Residential Tenancies Amendment Bill which removes rental bidding, raises the period for rental increase to 12 months, eliminates "no-cause" evictions, and allows victims of domestic violence to end a tenancy within two days' notice. Landlords seeking to evict tenants will have to apply to the Tenancy Tribunal with three examples of bad behaviour over a period of three months. The opposition National Party opposed the bill with MP Alfred Ngaro criticizing the bill for disadvantaging landlords.

On 11 August, Prime Minister Ardern announced that lockdowns would be reintroduced over the country in response to the discovery of four community transmissions, lasting from 12 August mid-day to 14 August midnight. Auckland would be placed under a Level 3 lockdown while the rest of the country would  be placed under a Level 2 lockdown. Following the discovery of more community transmissions, the Government extended the lockdowns until 11:59 pm local time on 26 August.

On 17 August 2020, Prime Minister Ardern delayed the 2020 New Zealand general election by four weeks until 17 October in response to the recent outbreak in COVID-19 community transmissions.  In addition, the dissolution of the New Zealand Parliament was pushed back 6 September.

On 24 August, Prime Minister Ardern announced that Auckland would remain under a Level 3 lockdown until 11:59 pm on 30 August, when the city and its surrounding region would move to a Level 2 lockdown. In addition, public gatherings in Auckland would be limited to ten people while a 50-person limit would be enforced for funerals and weddings. The rest of New Zealand will remain on a Level 2 lockdown until 6 September. In addition, all people using public transportation will be required to wear face masks.

On 27 August 2020, Associate Finance Minister Shaw attracted criticism from the opposition National Party's education spokesperson Nicola Willis, school principals, teachers unions' and several members of his own Green Party after he allocated NZ$11.7 million from the Government's $3 billion COVID-19 recovery fund to the private "Green School New Zealand" in Taranaki. This funding boost violated the Green Party's own policy of private schools receiving state funds. Shaw had defended the decision, claiming it would have created 200 jobs and boosted the local economy. The Education Minister Chris Hipkins stated that he would not have prioritised funding for the private school and sympathised with state schools' dissatisfaction with Shaw's decision. Following considerable criticism, Shaw apologised for approving the funding of the Green School, describing it as "an error of judgment" on 1 September. Representatives of the school have reportedly approach the Crown to convert part or all off the Government's grant into a loan. On 2 November, it was reported that Michael and Rachel Perrett, the owners of the Green School, had reached a settlement for the Government's NZ$11.7 million grant to be converted into a loan; a development that was welcomed by local principals.

On 14 September, Prime Minister Ardern extended the Alert Level 2.5 rating in Auckland and the Level 2 rating in the rest of the country by one week. She indicated that the Government would consider easing restrictions the following week. While the Government's decision was supported by Cabinet, New Zealand First leader and Deputy Prime Minister Winston Peters disagreed with the extension of lockdown restrictions, claiming they were unnecessary in the South Island. Similar sentiments were echoed by ACT Party leader David Seymour, who claimed they were hurting the country's businesses. In addition, the Government relaxed social distancing restrictions on public transportation including buses and planes.

On 21 September, Prime Minister Ardern announced that Auckland would move into Alert Level 2 on 23 September at 11:59pm while the rest of New Zealand would move into Alert Level 1 on 21 September at 11:59pm. Under Auckland's Alert Level 2 status, public gatherings of 100 people will be allowed but funerals and tangihanga will remain limited to 50 people.

On 12 October 2020, the Government signed an agreement with Pfizer and BioNTech to purchase 1.5 million COVID-19 vaccines. The COVID-19 Vaccine Strategy Task Force is also negotiating with other pharmaceutical companies to provide vaccines. In addition, the Government established a fund of $66.3 million to support a COVID-19 immunisation programme as soon as the vaccine is ready.

Second term (2020–present)

2020
On 17 October, Labour won the 2020 general election in a landslide, winning 50% of the vote and 65 seats in the House, the first time under the current MMP system that any party won enough seats to govern without a coalition or a confidence and supply agreement.

On 20 October, Newshub reported that Prime Minister Ardern was not intending to forge a formal coalition with the Green Party but was exploring the possibility of a lower-level support arrangement due to Labour's large parliamentary majority. During the 2020 election campaign on 14 October, Ardern had ruled out the Green's wealth tax policy.

Following prolonged negotiations, the Green Party agreed to enter into a cooperation agreement with the Labour Party on 31 October. Under this governing arrangement, co-leader James Shaw would remain Minister for Climate Change and become Associate Environment Minister while fellow co-leader Marama Davidson would become Minister for the Prevention of Family and Sexual Violence and Associate Minister of Housing. In addition, the Greens would chair two select committees, with details to be finalised on 2 November. During a Zoom call, 85% of the 150 Green Party delegates voted to accept this cooperation agreement with Labour.

On 18 November, the Tourism Minister Stuart Nash announced that the Government would introduce legislation to ban tourists from hiring vans that are not self-contained in order to reduce the waster problems associated with freedom camping. He also announced that Tourism New Zealand would be redirecting marketing to focus on "super wealthy" tourists from Europe, North America, and parts of Asia. That same day, Prime Minister Ardern and Education Minister Chris Hipkins announced a marketing campaign to encourage young people particularly women to enter vocational education and the trades.

On 18 November, Foreign Minister Mahuta joined her Australian, Canadian, British and United States counterparts in condemning the disqualification of pro-democracy Hong Kong legislators as a breach of Hong Kong's autonomy and rights under the Sino-British Joint Declaration. In response, the Chinese Foreign Ministry's spokesperson Zhao Lijian warned the Five Eyes countries, stating that "No matter if they have five eyes or 10 eyes, if they dare to harm China's sovereignty, security and development interests, they should beware of their eyes being poked and blinded." In response, Mahuta defended New Zealand's commitment to free speech, free media, and democracy.

On 26 November, the Government confirmed during its Speech from the Throne that the COVID-19 vaccine would be made free as part of its goal of keeping New Zealanders safe from COVID-19. Other key issues and promises addressed within the speech included building 18,000 public homes, raising the minimum wage, replacing the Resource Management Act 1991 and promoting economic recovery from COVID-19 through infrastructure investment and training incentives.

On 2 December 2020, Ardern declared a climate change emergency in New Zealand and pledged that the Government would be carbon neutral by 2025 through a parliamentary motion. As part of this commitment towards carbon neutrality under the framework of the Climate Change Response (Zero Carbon) Amendment Act, the public sector will be required to buy only electric or hybrid vehicles, government buildings will have to meet new building standards, and all 200 coal-fired boilers in public service buildings will be phased out. This motion was supported by the Labour, Green, and Māori parties but was opposed by the opposition National and ACT parties, which described the motion as "virtue signaling."

In mid-December, Prime Minister Ardern announced that New Zealand would be establishing travel bubbles with the Cook Islands and Australia the following year, facilitating two-way quarantine travel between these countries. On 17 December, Ardern also announced that the Government had purchased two more vaccines from the pharmaceutical companies AstraZeneca and Novavax for New Zealand, Tokelau, the Cook Islands, Niue and its Pacific partners Samoa, Tonga, and Tuvalu.

On 21 December, Immigration Minister Kris Faafoi announced a six-month extension for employer-assisted work and working holiday visa holders along with their partners and children in order to address New Zealand's labour shortage. In addition, a 12-month stand-down period for low-paid Essential Skills visa holders working in New Zealand for three years was also be suspended until January 2022.

2021
On 3 January 2021, COVID-19 Response Minister Chris Hipkins announced that travelers entering New Zealand from the United Kingdom and United States would be required to take pre-departure tests from 15 January 2020. From 26 January, the pre-departure test requirement was extended to all international travelers with the exception of those coming from Australia, Antarctica, and most Pacific Island states including Fiji, Samoa, Tokelau, Tuvalu, and Vanuatu. On 15 January, Prime Minister Jacinda Ardern announced the establishment of a one-way travel bubble for Cook Islanders traveling to New Zealand.

On 1 February 2021, the Minister of Local Government Nanaia Mahuta announced that the Government would pass legislation upholding local council's decisions to establish Māori wards and constituencies. This new law would also abolish an existing law allowing local referendums to veto decisions by councils to establish Māori wards. The Government intends to pass it into law before the scheduled 2022 local body elections.

On 3 February 2021, Prime Minister Ardern approved the Pfizer-BioNTech COVID-19 vaccine for use in New Zealand. The initial batches of the vaccine are scheduled to arrive in late March 2021, with frontline workers and the vulnerable given priority.

On 4 February 2021 Ardern announced that a new public holiday Matariki would be introduced on 24 June 2022. This fulfilled her election pledge in September 2020 to make Matariki a public holiday if Labour was re-elected during the 2020 general election.

On 5 February, Immigration New Zealand confirmed that New Zealand's refugee resettlement programme, which had been suspended in 2020 as a result of the COVID-19 pandemic, would resume. The Government plans to resettled 210 refugees by 30 June 2021. Refugees will undergo a two-week stay in managed isolation.

On 9 February, Foreign Minister Nanaia Mahuta announced the suspension of high-level bilateral military and political relations with Myanmar following the 2021 Myanmar coup d'état. They joined other Western governments in refusing to recognise the new military-led government and calling for the restoration of civilian-led rule. In addition, aid projects were diverted away from the Tatmadaw and a travel ban was imposed on Myanmar's military leaders.

On 11 February, Stuff reported that the Government's New Zealand Work Scheme to address the labour shortage in the fruit-picking sector caused by COVID-19 had only attracted 54 people since its launch in late November 2020. The scheme had offered up to NZ$200 to cover accommodation costs and a NZ$1,000 incentive payment to workers who had completed jobs that lasted for six weeks or longer.

On 13 February 2020, the Government agreed to pay NZ$40 million to 212 kiwifruit orchardists and Te Puke–based post harvest operator Seeka in order to settle a class action lawsuit alleging that the Government was liable for losses caused by the incursion of the kiwifruit vine disease Pseudomonas syringae (PSA), which swept through the Bay of Plenty region in 2010. Kiwifruit orchardists had initially challenged a Court of Appeal ruling that the Government could not be held liable for the damage caused by PSA despite the Ministry of Primary Industries allowing PSA into the country through the import of kiwifruit pollen from China. As a result of the settlement, the appeal was withdrawn.

On 14 February, Prime Minister Ardern announced that Auckland would move into an Alert Level 3 lockdown from 11:59pm that night for a period of three days. The rest of New Zealand will move into a Alert Level 2 lockdown for the same time period. The three-day lockdown is meant for the Government to get more information about a new community outbreak in Papatoetoe, South Auckland. Under Level 3, remote work is encouraged, while schools and day care centers continue to serve the children of essential workers. Limits have also been placed on public gatherings and travel around Auckland. Under Level 2, gatherings are restricted to 100 people and travel to Auckland is restricted.

On 15 February, the Government tabled its response to the report of the Social Services and Community Committee on Matters related to Forced Adoptions. At the same time, Minister of Justice Kris Faafoi announced that the Government would pursue reform of adoption laws during the 53rd Parliament. The Government had already referred a review of surrogacy laws to the Law Commission, the adoption inquiry is therefore to be conducted by the Ministry of Justice.

On 24 February, it was reported that the Government's Progressive Home Ownership Scheme, which cost NZ$17 million, had only resettled 12 families in the last seven months. While Housing Minister Megan Woods defended the scheme's achievements, National's housing spokesperson Nicola Willis described the program as a failure.

On 25 February, the Local Government Minister Nanaia Mahuta's Local Electoral (Māori Wards and Māori Constituencies) Amendment Act 2021, which eliminated mechanisms for holding public referendums on the establishment of Māori wards and constituencies on local bodies,  passed its third reading. The Bill was supported by the Labour, Green and Māori parties but opposed by the opposition National and ACT parties. National attempted to delay the bill by mounting a twelve-hour filibuster challenging all of the Bill's ten clauses.

On 2 March, Prime Minister Ardern and Health Minister Andrew Little announced that the Government would be appointing a panel of experts to review the drug-purchasing agency Pharmac's timeliness and transparency of decision-making.

On 23 March, Prime Minister Ardern and Housing Minister Megan Woods announced a housing package to address the country's housing shortage, which includes a $3.8 billion housing acceleration fund, increases to First Home Products' income caps, changes to regional price caps, extending "bright-line tests" to ten years, eliminating the interest deductibility loophole on residential property, and extending the Apprenticeship Boost initiative to support the trades and trade training, and borrowing $2 billion to increase land acquisition in order to boost the supply of housing. The NZ Property Investors Federation President Andrew King criticised the Government's decision to eliminate interest rate tax deductions for landlords. The Government's housing package was welcomed by Green finance spokesperson Julie Anne Genter.

On 14 April, the New Zealand Government confirmed that a ban on live cattle exports by sea would be implemented over the two next years. The ban came as a result of a review into livestock exports launched two years ago by Agricultural Minister Damien O'Connor. The Government's ban on live cattle exports was criticised by the Animal Genetics Trade Association which complained that the ban would prevent the export of breeding cows, which would potentially lead to the culling of 150,000 calves. By contrast, the animal welfare NGO SAFE welcomed the ban, stating that it would mean that animals would no longer suffer in countries with lower standards of animal welfare than New Zealand.

On 21 April, Health Minister Andrew Little announced that the existing 20 district health boards will be abolished and replaced by a new public health agency known as  Health New Zealand, which will be modeled after the United Kingdom's National Health Service. In addition, a new Māori Health Authority will be established to set up policies for Māori health and to oversee the provision of Māori health services. A Public Health Authority will also be established to centralise public health work.

On 18 May, the Health Minister Andrew Little announced that the Government would seek to amend Section 23 of the Medicines Act 1981 after the High Court Judge Rebecca Ellis ruled in favour of the Ngai Kaitiaki Tuku Ihu Medical Action Society's contention that the Government's decision to approve the Pfizer–BioNTech COVID-19 vaccine exceeded the powers of the Medicines Act. The Medical Action Society had argued that this action would have undermined public trust in the vaccine and wasted vaccine stock already in use in New Zealand.

On 14 June 2021, the Government announced that it would introduce subsidies to make electric vehicles cheaper while raising the price of new petrol and new diesel vehicles, commencing in July. This policy announcement followed a report by the Climate Change Commission on 9 June 2021 advocating the reduction of farm animal numbers, a ban on new household gas connections by 2025, and a shift to electric vehicles in order to reduce greenhouse emissions. In response to the policy announcement, EV City owner David Boot said that it would boost demand for electric cars while expressing concern about the need for educating electric car users. Motor Trade Association chief executive Craig Pomare claimed that the rebate would not be enough to encourage motor users to make the switch to electric cars while Federated Farmers national president Andrew Hoggard express concerns about the lack of electric vehicle alternatives for farmers and tradespersons.

In mid–June 2021, Prime Minister Ardern announced that the New Zealand Government would formally apologise for the dawn raids which had disproportionately targeted members of the Pasifika communities during the 1970s and 1980s. This official apology will take place at the Auckland Town Hall on 26 June 2021. The Government's apology announcement was supported by both the Minister for Pacific Peoples William Sio and National Party leader Judith Collins.

On 7 July, the ACT party alleged that the Labour Government had spent $4 million-worth of Parliament's time asking itself questions since the 2020 election, in response to criticism of ACT's use of 15 minutes to ask its leader David Seymour questions about his member's bill, which has been described as "extremely unlikely to ever become law." Ministers being asked questions by their own party's MPs has been a feature of Question Time under successive governments for decades. The Shadow Leader of the House, National MP Chris Bishop, who has been critical of the use of "patsy questions" in the past, said that Seymour was showing "remarkable hutzpah" in complaining about the practice the day after making use of it himself.

On 16 July, the farmers advocacy group Groundswell NZ staged a nationwide protest campaign called "Howl of a Protest" in 57 towns and cities across New Zealand to protest the Government's freshwater, biodiversity, winter grazing, climate change, and Clean Car Package rebate scheme (known as the "Ute tax"). Farmers, tradespersons and agricultural sector professionals claimed that the so-called "Ute tax" discriminated Ute users due to the lack of electrical alternatives. In response, the Agriculture Minister Damien O'Connor  stated that farmers had a right to speak their mind but warned that Groundswell's protests would create the perception that farmers were opposed to improving freshwater quality, addressing climate change, managing animal welfare, and ignored the Government's efforts to work with the sector. Meanwhile, Prime Minister Ardern defended the Government's commitment to the environment and brushed off suggestions of a rural-urban divide in New Zealand.

On 30 July 2021, Justice Minister Kris Faafoi introduced the Conversion Practices Prohibition Legislation Bill with the goal of banning conversion therapy. On 6 August 2021, the Bill passed its first reading with the support of all political parties except the opposition National Party, which wanted provisions protecting parents from prosecution.

On 16 August, Prime Minister Ardern and New Zealand Defence Force chief Air Marshal Kevin Short announced that New Zealand would deploy 40 troops to evacuate 53 New Zealanders and 37 Afghans who had worked for the NZ military in response to the 2021 Taliban offensive. The Afghan evacuees include nuclear family members, numbering about 200 individuals. By 23 August, the first batch of Afghan evacuees had arrived in New Zealand via the United Arab Emirates, where arrangements were made for their travel to New Zealand with the assistance of the Australian Defence Force. In addition, New Zealand provided $3 million in funding for the International Committee of the Red Cross and the United Nations High Commissioner for Refugees in Afghanistan. The Taliban's Cultural Commission representative Abdul Qahar Balkhi welcomed New Zealand's humanitarian aid to the Afghan people.

On 17 August, the Government reinstated Alert Level 4 restrictions on New Zealand in response to a community outbreak of the Delta variant in Auckland.  In response to the spread of community cases in Auckland and Wellington, the lockdown was extended for the rest of the month on 20 August and 23 August. On 23 August, Parliament was suspended for a week with the exception of online select committee hearings. National Party leader Judith Collins and ACT Party leader David Seymour criticised this suspension as undemocratic and an "overreach of power."

Following the 2021 Taliban offensive which led to a significant exodus of Afghan refugees, the Ministry of Foreign Affairs and Trade suspended the processing of residency applications from Afghan nationals in late August 2021, citing the "rapidly deteriorating situation" caused by the Taliban offensive which complicated international evacuation efforts. The Government's decision to suspend the processing of Afghan residency visa applications was criticised by human rights advocates and Afghan migrants. Former Afghan interpreter Diamond Kazimi stated that 200 Afghan families who had assisted the NZDF were still waiting for their visa applications to be processed. By 26 August, a Royal New Zealand Air Force (RNZAF) C-130 Hercules had made two evacuation flights from Kabul. That same day, the RNZAF suspended its evacuation flights following the 2021 Kabul airport attacks. By that stage, 370 people had been evacuated to the United Arab Emirates, where they were transferred to New Zealand.

On 23 August, the Government temporarily suspended the sitting of the New Zealand Parliament for one week at the advice of Director-General of Health Ashley Bloomfield. Select committees will continue online. The suspension of Parliament was criticised by National Party leader Collins and ACT Party leader Seymour  as undemocratic and an "overreach of power." Labour, the Greens and the opposition Māori Party proposed a virtual Zoom Parliament and Question Time but National COVID-19 spokesperson Chris Bishop countered that Parliament should be able to go ahead if the Prime Minister was able to hold press conferences at Level 4. On 31 August, Speaker Trevor Mallard confirmed that Parliament would continue meeting under Alert Level 4 conditions with only ten MPs and a small number of staff attending the debating chamber. While Labour, National, the ACT, and Green parties agreed to send MPs, the Māori Party stated that it would not since it was unsafe.

On 22 September, the Government announced a ten-year plan called Kia Manawanui for improving mental health outcomes including setting up an external oversight group headed by Auckland University of Technology (AUT) professor and Waitematā District Health Board chair Judy McGregor. In response, the National Party's mental health spokesperson Matt Doocey criticised the plan, stating that " what is needed now is action, not more vision statements, working groups and nice words." In mid-September, the Government also announced the members of the interim boards of Health New Zealand and the Māori Health Authority. Health NZ will be chaired by Rob Campbell while the Health Authority will be led by co-chairs Sharon Shea and Tipa Mahuta.

On 30 September, the Counter-Terrorism Legislation Act 2021 passed its third reading, introducing new counter-terrorism laws which criminalise the planning of terror attacks and expand the powers of police to conduct warrantless searches. The counter-terrorism bill was supported by the Labour and National parties but was opposed by the Green, ACT and Māori parties. That same day, the Government introduced the Te Kāhui o Matariki Public Holiday Bill to make the Māori New Year Matariki a public holiday. During its first reading, the bill was supported by the Labour, Green and Māori parties but opposed by National and ACT.

On 30 September, Immigration Minister Kris Faafoi announced that the Government would introduce a one-off simplified residency pathway known as the "2021 resident visa" for migrants on work visas residing in New Zealand including their families. Faafoi estimated that 165,000 migrants would be eligible for the 2021 resident visa programme, which will be rolled out in two phases in December 2021 and March 2022. According to Faafoi, the scheme was meant to address the impact of closed borders and economic hardship caused by COVID-19 on migrants. The announcement was welcomed by the National Party's immigration spokesperson Erica Stanford and Migrant Workers Association President Anu Kaloti for addressing the needs and concerns of migrants.

On 7 October, Foreign Minister Mahuta confirmed that the Government was sending a special representative to the Middle East to help 825 stranded Afghan visa holders to leave Afghanistan. During the 2021 evacuation from Afghanistan, the Government had granted 1,253 visas to Afghans. However, only 428 had arrived in New Zealand following the Taliban takeover.

On 19 October, the Labour and National parties supported a bipartisan housing bill called the Resource Management (Enabling Housing Supply and Other Matters) Amendment Bill, which aims to build 105,500 new homes over the next eight years. Under the proposed bill, three homes of up to three storeys can be built on most sites without the need for going through the resource consent process. The Government plans to pass the bill by the end of 2021, with local councils to implement it from August 2022. The Bill passed its second reading on 7 December.

On 21 October, the New Zealand and United Kingdom Governments signed a free trade agreement eliminating tariffs on 97% of New Zealand exports to the UK. This free trade agreement is worth NZ$970 million and will eliminate tariffs on all New Zealand exports including honey, wine, kiwifruit, onions, most industrial products. In addition, a range of dairy and beef exports will be tariff free after a period of 15 years.

On 27 October, Local Government Minister Nanaia Mahuta confirmed that the Government would proceed with its "Three Waters reform programme" to take control of the management of storm water, drinking water and wastewater from local councils and territorial bodies. The "Three Waters" reforms would place these water services and assets under the control of four new water entities in order to improve the quality of water utilities and lower the cost of water services. The Government planned to start creating these four new entities in late 2021, which will assume control of water utilities in July 2024. The Government's decision to centralize water utilities and services was criticised by several local councils and mayors including Mayor of Auckland Phil Goff, Mayor of Christchurch Lianne Dalziel, Mayor of Hastings Sandra Hazlehurst, Mayor of the Far North District John Carter, Mayor of Dunedin Aaron Hawkins, and Mayor of Wellington Andy Foster. In addition, the opposition National and ACT parties have vowed to repeal the Three Waters reforms if elected into government. By contrast, Ngāi Tahu's Dr Te Maire Tau, the co-chair of Te Kura Taka Pini (the iwi's freshwater group) welcomed the Three Water reforms, claiming they would improve water services and environmental outcomes.

On 29 October, Ministry for Disability Issues Carmel Sepuloni and Justice Minister Little announced that the Government would establish a new Ministry for Disabled People within the Ministry of Social Development to reform the disability support system and improve outcomes for disabled peoples. In addition, the Government announced a new Accessibility for New Zealanders Bill and the establishment of a new Accessibility Governance Board. The new proposed disability ministry and legislative framework were welcomed Disability Rights Commissioner Paula Tesoriero, Te Ao Mārama chair Tristram Ingham, New Zealand Disability Support Network chief executive Peter Reynolds, and the Green Party's disability spokesperson Jan Logie. Disabled Person Assembly chief executive Prudence Walker welcomed the Government's efforts to prioritise the needs of disabled people but express concerns about funding, disabled leadership, and the limitations of the Accessibility Governance Board.

On 11 November, Justice Minister Kris Faafoi introduced the Three Strikes Legislation Repeal Bill to repeal the Sentencing and Parole Reform Act 2010. While the proposed repeal legislation was supported by the Labour and Green parties, the opposition National and ACT parties defended the "three strikes law." National's justice spokesperson Simon Bridges and ACT's justice spokeswoman Nicole McKee claimed that repealing the "three strikes law" would encourage gangs and violent crime offenders.

On 24 November, Hipkins announced that Indonesia, Fiji, India, Pakistan, and Brazil would be removed from the "Very High-Risk" classification in early December 2021; allowing travellers from these countries to enter New Zealand on the same basis as other international travellers. In addition, Hipkins confirmed that managed isolation and quarantine (MIQ) restrictions would be eased in three stages in 2022. First, all fully vaccinated New Zealanders and other eligible travellers from Australia would be exempt from MIQ from 17 January. Second, all fully vaccinated New Zealanders and other eligible travellers from all other countries would be exempt from MIQ from 14 February. Third, all fully vaccinated travellers would be exempt from MIQ from 30 April.

On 24 November, the Government's COVID-19 Response (Vaccinations) Legislation Act 2021 passed its third reading, allowing businesses to dismiss employees who refuse to be vaccinated against COVID-19. The Bill was opposed by the opposition National, ACT, and Māori parties, which variable criticised the rushed and divisive nature of the legislation and alleged that vulnerable communities would be adversely affected.

On 25 November, the Government announced it would soon release a new Social Security Insurance scheme, labelled the biggest expansion of the welfare state since ACC, which would be funded by a 1–2 percent tax increase.

On 30 November 2021, Minister of Tourism Stuart Nash announced that the Government would be introducing a Self-Contained Vehicles Bill in February 2022 to address the issue of freedom camping. Under the proposed legislation, only self-contained vehicles with fixed toilets will be able to stay on land managed by local councils. Non-self contained vehicles will be allowed to stay on Department of Conservation–managed land and commercial grounds unless the Department has prohibited it. Freedom campers will be allowed to stay in tents overnight where permitted.

On 9 December, Associate Health Minister Dr Ayesha Verrall confirmed that the Government would introduce new legislation under the Smokefree 2025 goal that would ban anyone under the age of 14 from legally purchasing tobacco for the rest of their lives. Older generations will only be permitted to buy tobacco products with very low-levels of nicotine while fewer shops will be allowed to sell tobacco products.  The Government's announcement was welcomed by the Green Party and several health leaders including New Zealand Medical Association chair Dr Alistair Humphrey, Health Coalition Aotearoa smokefree expert advisory group chair Sally Liggins, and University of Auckland Associate Dean of Pacific Collin Tukuitonga for addressing the health effects of smoking particularly within the Māori and Pasifika communities. By contrast, ACT health spokesperson Karen Chhour criticised the proposed legislation, stating that prohibition was unworkable and claiming that it would create a black market for tobacco products.

On 15 December, the Resource Management (Enabling Housing Supply and Other Matters) Amendment Act 2021 passed its third and final reading with the bipartisan support of most parties except ACT. This bill intends to make it easier to build houses in major cities in order to address the country's housing shortage.

2022
On 16 January 2022 Foreign Minister Mahuta and Prime Minister Ardern announced that New Zealand was making an initial donation of NZ$500,000 to Tonga in response to the 2022 Hunga Tonga–Hunga Ha'apai eruption and tsunami. She also confirmed that the  Ministry of Foreign Affairs, New Zealand Defence Force, and other government agencies were working through air and sea options to provide assistance to Tonga. In addition, a Royal New Zealand Air Force (RNZAF) Lockheed P-3 Orion would be sent on a reconnaissance flight as soon as it was safe to do so. On 17 January, the P-63 Orion departed for Tonga following reports of no continued ashfall in the island nation.

On 26 January, Mahuta and Ardern expressed support for Ukrainian sovereignty and urged Russia to deescalate tensions in accordance with international law. Ardern also indicated that New Zealand would consider applying targeted sanctions against Russia in the event of hostilities.

On 26 January, the Government asked suppliers Abbott Laboratories, Roche, and Siemens to give the Government priority in ordering stocks of rapid antigen tests. The Government was criticised by several private companies and representative bodies including the Health Works Group, the Food and Grocery Council, and InScience for allegedly commandeering their orders. In response to criticism, Health Director-General Ashley Bloomfield denied that the Government was requisitioning their orders but was merely asking suppliers to consolidate forward orders of rapid antigen tests. The opposition National and ACT parties accused the Government of requisitioning rapid antigen tests from the private sector to hide its alleged incompetence in obtaining rapid antigent tests.

In late January 2022, Transport Minister Michael Wood announced that the New Zealand Government had approved a NZ$14.6 billion project to establish a partially tunneled light rail network between Auckland Airport  and the Auckland CBD. The planned light rail network will integrate with current train and bus hubs as well as the City Rail Link's stations and connections. Transport Minister Michael Wood also added that the Government would decide on plans to establish a second harbour crossing at Waitemata Harbour in 2023. The light rail network was supported by the Green Party but criticised by the ACT party as a waste of taxpayer revenue.

On 15 February 2022, the Government's Conversion Practices Prohibition Legislation Act 2022 passed its third and final reading, becoming law with broad cross-party support.  The bill's passage was aided by the new National Party leader Christopher Luxon's decision to abandon the Party's bloc vote opposition to the legislation and allow caucus members a conscientious vote.

Following the 2022 Russian invasion of Ukraine, Ardern and Mahuta issued a statement on 24 February condemning Russia's invasion and calling on Russia to withdraw from Ukraine. In addition,  New Zealand suspended high-level diplomatic contacts with Russia and introduced travel bans and export controls.

On 1 March, New Zealand and the United Kingdom formally ratified a bilateral free trade agreement announced in October 2021. This agreement eliminates all tariffs on New Zealand exports particularly meat, butter and cheese along with duties on 99.5% of current trade. Ardern described the free trade agreement as a "gold-standard free trade agreement" that would help accelerate the country's economic recovery.

On 7 March, Ardern announced that the Government would be introducing a new Russia Sanctions Act 2022 under urgency to enable autonomous sanctions against in response to its recent invasion of Ukraine. This legislation would allow sanctions to be placed on those responsible for or associated with the Russian invasion of Ukraine including people, services, companies and assets. Key provisions include freezing assets based in New Zealand; preventing people and companies from moving their money and assets to NZ in order to escape foreign sanctions; banning super yachts, ships and aircraft from entering New Zealand waters and airspace, and imposing a travel ban on 100 top Russian officials. Ardern also indicated that this proposed bill would allow sanctions to be imposed on other states complicit with Russian aggression including Belarus. On 9 March, the Russian Sanctions Bill passed with unanimous support from all parties in Parliament.

On 10 March, Broadcasting Minister Kris Faafoi announced plans to merge the two public broadcasters Radio New Zealand (RNZ) and Television New Zealand (TVNZ) into a new public broadcasting service. The new broadcasting entity would have complete editorial independence, operate under a charter, and be funded through a mixture of government funding and commercial revenue. It is expected to launch in July 2023. While the proposed merger was welcomed by RNZ chief executive Paul Thompson and TVNZ chief executive Simon Power, the opposition National Party described it as wasteful and unnecessary.
 
On 14 March, Ardern announced that the Government would reduce fuel excise taxes and road user charges by 25 cents a litre for the next three months from 11:59 pm that night. In addition, all public transport fares would be halved from 1 April 2022 for the next three months. This announcement was in response to a global energy crisis caused by the Russian invasion of Ukraine. Ardern had initially denied that New Zealand was experiencing a "cost of living crisis" but had since reconsidered her position. Over the past 12 months, the rising cost of living had led New Zealanders to spend an extra NZ$4000 to $5000 on basic commodities such as food, rent and fuel. Customers spent an extra NZ$678 a year on petrol on average.

On 15 March, Ardern announced that the Government would introduce a new two-year work visa programme allowing New Zealand citizens and residents of Ukrainian descent to sponsor Ukrainian family members seeking to shelter in New Zealand. This "Special Ukraine Policy" aims to bring over 4,000 Ukrainians and comes with work and study rights. In addition, the Government contributed another NZ$4 billion in humanitarian aid.

On 17 March, the Government launched its "Te Takanga o Te Wā" history curriculum, which emphasizes the teaching of New Zealand history including the contributions of the Māori, Pasifika and Asian communities. The curriculum will be launched in 2023 and will be compulsory in schools up to Year 10.

On 24 March, Immigration Minister Kris Faafoi and Australian Home Affairs Minister Karen Andrews jointly announced that the two governments had reached an agreement for New Zealand to accept 150 refugees a year as part of its annual refugee quota from the Nauru Regional Processing Centre or asylum seekers temporarily in Australia for "processing." Refugees being resettled in New Zealand will have to go through the United Nations High Commissioner for Refugees (UNHCR) process and meet the criteria for NZ's refugee quota requirements. As part of the deal, 450 refugees would be resettled in New Zealand over a three year period. The Morrison Government had decided to accept a 2012 deal between former New Zealand Prime Minister John Key and Australian Prime Minister Julia Gillard for New Zealand to accept several asylum seekers who had travelled to Australia by sea. Subsequent Australian governments had declined to accept New Zealand's offer due to concerns that it would encourage more asylum seekers to travel by boat to Australia and that former asylum seekers could gain New Zealand citizenship and migrate to Australia.

On 25 March 2022, Ardern and Mahuta joined the Australian Government in expressing concerns about a proposed Solomon Islands security agreement with China, which would allow China to deploy military and security forces in the Solomon Islands and establish a military base there.

On 8 May, Ardern announced that the Government would allocating NZ$23 million from the State Sector Decarbonisation Fund to reduce greenhouse emissions. As part of the investment, NZ$10 million would be spent on replacing coal boilers at 180 New Zealand schools with clean wood burners or electrical heating. In addition, NZ$12.92 million would be spent on other projects including purchasing electrical vehicles, charging infrastructure, and upgrading heating systems at various public facilities including hospitals, police stations, the University of Waikato and Northland Polytechnic.

On 9 May, Police Minister Poto Williams, Corrections Minister Kelvin Davis, and Justice Minister Kris Faafoi announced that the Government would be investing NZ$562 million to combat crime over the next four years. In addition to a package to help businesses deal with ram raids, the Government would allocate NZ$94 million to combating gangs and organised crime; NZ$208 million to new firearms control unit within the New Zealand Police; NZ$164.6 million in operating cash and NZ$20.7 million capital funding to training Police to the standards of the Armed Offenders Squad and recruiting new Police officers; and NZ$$198.3 million to prison rehabilitation programmes and recruiting new Corrections officers.

On 11 May, Ardern announced that New Zealand's border reopening would be accelerated. From 16 May, the border would reopen to Pacific Island visitors. From 4 July, the border would reopen to all work visa holders and a new "green list" would be introduced in order to attract "high-skilled" migrants for "hard to fill positions." In addition, the border would reopen to all visitor and student visa holders as well as cruise ships on 31 July. In addition, streamlined residency pathways would be introduced in September 2022 for migrants in "green list" occupations or who earn twice the median wage. However, new working restrictions would be introduced to international students including limiting working rights to degree-level students with the exception of certain specified occupations, limiting undergraduate working rights to the length of their courses, and preventing students from applying for a second post-study work visa. The Government's decision to exclude nurses, teachers, and dairy farm managers from the visa residency "green list" was also criticised by professional bodies. In early August 2022, the Government acknowledged that it had not consulted professional nursing organisations and the district health boards about its nursing "green list" visa scheme. On 8 August, the Ministry of Business, Innovation and Employment admitted that only nine nurses had applied for the "green list" scheme by late July 2022.

In late May 2022, Ardern led a trade and tourism mission to the United States. During her trip, she urged the Biden Administration to join the Comprehensive and Progressive Agreement for Trans-Pacific Partnership (CPTPP) and promoted New Zealand's firearms legislation in response to the Robb Elementary School shooting. On 28 May, Ardern signed a memorandum of understanding with Governor of California Gavin Newsom facilitating bilateral cooperation between New Zealand and California in climate change emissions mitigation and research.

On 2 June, Mahuta introduced the Water Services Entities Bill as the first of several new bills to entrench the Three Waters reform programme into law. The  proposed bill would establish the four regional water services entities which would take over management of water infrastructure from the 67 local councils. While councils would retain ownership of their water assets through a "community share" arrangement, the new water service entities would exercise effective control over the water assets. Mahuta also confirmed that further legislation would be introduced to facilitate the transfer of assets and liabilities from local authorities to the Water Services Entities, integrate entities into other regulatory systems, and to ensure economic regulation and consumer protection over the new entities.
The opposition National and ACT parties claimed that the proposed bill amounted to the theft of local water assets, bureaucratic centralisation, and would inflame ethnic divisions. Communities 4 Local Democracy leader and Manawatū District Mayor Helen Worboys opposed the bill on the grounds that it would take local community assets without compensation.

On 7 June, the Government's Pae Ora (Healthy Futures) Act 2022 passed its third reading. The bill replaces the country's existing district health boards with a new Crown agency called Health New Zealand and establishes as separate Māori Health Authority. The Health Futures Act also establishes a new Public Health Agency within the Ministry of Health while strengthening the Ministry's stewardship role. It also includes a rural health strategy. While Labour and the Māori Party supported the bill as a means of facilitating health reforms and ensuring Māori co-governance, the opposition National Party questioned the government's proposed reforms while the ACT Party expressed concerns about racial division.

On 13 June, a cabinet reshuffle occurred. Kris Faafoi resigned from Parliament, with his immigration, justice, and broadcasting portfolios being assumed by Michael Wood, Kiri Allan, and Willie Jackson. In addition, Ardern confirmed that Speaker of the House Trevor Mallard would be resigning in mid-August 2022 to assume a diplomatic post in Europe. Adrian Rurawhe was designated as his successor. In addition, Poto Williams stepped down from her Police ministerial portfolio, which was assumed by Chris Hipkins. Priyanca Radhakrishnan was promoted to Cabinet while retaining her community and voluntary sector, ethnic communities, youth, associate social development portfolios and adopting the associate workplace relations portfolios. Former Chief Whip Kieran McAnulty became deputy leader of the House while gaining the associate transport, associate local government, emergency management and racing portfolios. In addition, Dr Ayesha Verrall assumed the COVID-19 response and Research, Science and Innovation ministerial portfolios;  Duncan Webb became the new Chief Whip; and Meka Whatiri assumed the food safety portfolio. Labour list MPs Dan Rosewarne and Soraya Peke-Mason replaced the outgoing Faafoi and Mallard.

In mid-June 2022, Broadcasting Minister Willie Jackson introduced draft legislation to formally merge public broadcasters Radio New Zealand and TVNZ into a new non-profit autonomous Crown entity called Aotearoa New Zealand Public Media (ANZPM). The new broadcasting service is expected to come into existence on 1 March 2023. Under the proposed Aotearoa New Zealand Public Media Bill, RNZ and TVNZ would become subsidiaries of the new entity, headed by a single board. ANZPM would be funded through a mixture of commercial and government funding. The new organisation would also operate under a charter outlining goals and responsibilities, with editorial independence being enshrined in its statutory legislation. The Government has also allocated NZ$370m over four years in operating expenditure and $306m in capital funding from the 2022 New Zealand budget for funding the ANZPM.

On 27 June, Ardern confirmed that New Zealand would contribute NZ$4.5 million worth of aid to the NATO Trust Fund including medical kits, fuel, communications equipment, and rations for the Ukrainian Army, bringing the total amount of New Zealand military assistance to Ukraine to $33 million. In addition, the Government dispatched a military officer to support the International Criminal Court's investigation into alleged Russian war crimes. New Zealand also contributed $1 million to the ICC Trust Fund for Victims and the ICC Office of the Prosecutor. In addition, the Government extended the deployment and number of New Zealand military and intelligence personnel assisting NATO forces in the United Kingdom, Belgium, and Germany.

On 30 June, Mahuta and Parker confirmed that New Zealand would support Ukraine's legal challenge at the International Court of Justice (ICJ) contesting Russia's claim that it had invaded Ukraine in response to alleged Ukrainian genocide in the Luhansk and Donetsk regions. This marked the second time that New Zealand had filed a legal challenge at the ICJ in support of another country. In 2012, New Zealand had supported Australia's case against Japanese whaling at the ICJ.

On 11 July, Economic and Regional Development Minister Stuart Nash announced that the Government had loaned NZ$6 million from the Regional Strategic Partnership Fund to help food producer New Zealand Functional Foods build an oat milk factory in Makarewa, Southland. The factory will cost NZ$50 million and is due to be completed in 2023.  The oat milk factory is estimated to produce 80 million litres of oat milk and create 50 new jobs. While New Zealand produces oats, the country lacked an oat milk processing facility and was forced to import the product from Australia.

On 13 July, Police Minister Hipkins and Justice Minister Kiri Allan announced that the Government would introduce several new laws to combat criminal gangs including a new criminal offence for firing a gun with intention to intimidate; expanding the range of offences for Police to seize vehicles and financial assets; empowering Police and law enforcement agencies to seize cash over NZ$10,000 found in suspicious circumstances; and expanding Police search and warrant powers to find and confiscate weapons from gang members. Hipkins confirmed that these new offenses would be packaged in a new omnibus amendment bill. In response, the National Party's acting police spokesperson Chris Penk claimed that the Government's measures were insufficient in tackling organised crime and called on the Government to ban gang patches and giving Police the powers to disrupt gangs' communications, ability to organise their activities, and warrantless search powers.

On 19 July, the Government extended the 25-cent fuel tax cut and the half price public transportation subsidy until late January 2023 in a bid to combat rising inflation in New Zealand.

On 27 July, the Government's Smokefree Environments and Regulated Products (Smoked Tobacco) Amendment Bill passed its first reading. The bill proposes reducing the number of retailers allowed to sell tobacco, reducing the amount of nicotine allowed in tobacco products, and banning the sale of tobacco to anyone born on or after 1 January 2009. The bill was supported by most parties with the exception of the libertarian ACT Party. While the National and Green parties supported the legislation, the former voiced concern about the experimental nature of the bill while the latter raised concerns about criminal prohibition pushing the tobacco industry "underground."

On 1 August, the Government launched its "cost of living payment" support programme as part of the 2022 New Zealand Budget. People eligible for these payments include New Zealand tax residents 18 years and above who are earning below NZ$70,000 a year, and who are not entitled to the Winter Energy Payment and are not in prison. Two million people are considered to be eligible for the cost of living payments. The first NZ$116 payment was released on 1 August with the second and third payments following on 1 September and 1 October 2022. The rollout was plagued by reports that overseas-based New Zealanders were receiving payments since the Inland Revenue Department had opted to dispense the payments automatically rather than manually check the eligibility of tax residents. The opposition National Party accused the Government of wasting taxpayer money.

On 1 August, Health Minister Little announced that the Government would be spending NZ$14.4 million to recruit more health workers including doctors, nurses, and radiographers for the country's health workforce. As part of the package, the Government would be providing overseas nurses NZ$10,000 to help cover registration costs. In addition, the Government announced that it would be launching a six-month bridging programme for overseas-trained doctors. Other measures include encouraging retired nurses to return to work, expanding a pilot programme allowing overseas-trained doctors to intern at general practitioners' clinics rather than hospitals, and boosting the number of nurse practitioners and doctors. The Government also confirmed that it would launch a national and international healthcare recruitment campaign in coordination with the TVNZ soap opera series Shortland Street. The new international recruitment service would be housed within the new public health agency Health New Zealand.

On 9 August, the Government's Three Strikes Legislation Repeal Bill passed its third and final reading, repealing the Sentencing and Parole Reform Act 2010. The bill was supported by the Labour, Green, and Māori parties but was opposed by the National and ACT parties. While Justice Minister Kiri Allan and Green MP Elizabeth Kerekere welcomed the repeal of what they described as a punitive law that did little to rehabilitate or reintegrate criminals, the National and ACT parties' justice spokespersons Paul Goldsmith and Nicole McKee claimed the Government was ignoring the crime rate and vowed to reinstate the Sentencing and Parole Reform Act if re-elected in the future.

On 22 August 2022, the New Zealand Government purchased Kiwibank's holdings company Kiwi Group Holdings for an estimated NZ$2.1 billion. As a result, the Government acquired full control of the state-owned bank from the New Zealand Superannuation Fund, ACC, and New Zealand Post.

On 30 August, Revenue Minister David Parker announced that it would introduce legislation to apply the Goods and Services Tax (GST) to KiwiSaver fees. The Inland Revenue Department estimated that this proposed tax change could generate NZ$226 million in tax revenue from 2026. Following intense public criticism from fund managers and the opposition National Party, the Government abandoned its plans to apply GST taxation on Kiwisaver fees.

Following the death of Queen Elizabeth II, Ardern announced that a one-off public holiday would be held on 26 September to mark the monarch's passing. The holiday would coincide with a state memorial service for Elizabeth at the Wellington Cathedral of St Paul. This holiday is similar to other public holidays held in the United Kingdom on 19 September and Australia on 22 September to mark the Queen's passing. While the Greens and opposition National Party supported the Government's plans for the one-off holiday, the ACT Party and businesses expressed concerns about the adverse economic impact on businesses. On 20 September, Parliament passed urgent legislation creating a once-off public holiday on 26 September. While Labour, National and the Green parties supported the bill, it was opposed by the ACT and Māori parties.

On 12 September, Ardern announced that the country's COVID-19 Protection Framework ("traffic light system") would end at 11:59pm that night. As a result, face masks will be eliminated for most public spaces and transportation with the exception of hospitals, clinics, pharmacies, and aged care facilities. In addition, household contacts of COVID-19 positive individuals will not be required to isolate unless they test positive for COVID-19. In addition, vaccine mandates for all travellers entering New Zealand and healthcare workers will end on 13 September and 27 September respectively. COVID-19 antiviral medicines will also be freely provided to COVID-19 positive individuals aged 65 years and above as well as Māori and Pasifika COVID-19 positive individuals aged 50 years and above.

On 28 September, the Government passed the Animal Welfare Amendment Act 2022 which would ban live animal exports from April 2023. The bill was supported by the Labour and Green parties but was opposed by the opposition National and ACT parties. The Government's ban on live animal exports was motivated by the Gulf Livestock 1 disaster in September 2020.

On 11 October, Prime Minister Ardern announced plans to tax the emissions produced by farm animals by 2025. Agricultural emissions by farm animals including burping and urination account for about half of New Zealand's emissions. The Government's proposal was criticised by Federated Farmers national president Andrew Hoggard, who said it would hurt the farming sector by discouraging farmers from making a living. Greenpeace Aotearoa New Zealand's lead climate campaigner Christine Rose claimed the Government's proposed tax on agricultural emissions was insufficient and favoured dairy producers over beef and sheep farmers and Māori landowners.

On 21 October, Transport Minister Michael Wood announced that the Government would launch a NZ$1.3 billion national payment system for all bus, train and ferry fares called the National Ticketing Solution. Waka Kotahi (the New Zealand Transport Agency) and several urban and regional councils had signed contracts with the public transport company Cubic Corporation. The national payment system would be gradually rolled out across the country and would replace existing municipal and regional payment systems including the Bee Card.

On 27 October, the Government's Fair Pay Agreements Act 2022 passed its third reading in Parliament. The bill allows employers and employees to collectively bargain at an industry-wide level. While the bill was supported by the Labour, Green and Māori parties, it was opposed by the National and ACT parties which vowed to repeal it if elected into government at the next general election.

On 4 November 2022, the Government introduced the Arms Act Amendment Bill to stop gun licenses from expiring until Police were able to resolve a backlog of renewing firearms licenses. At the time, there were 12,000 people on the waitlist for a new firearms license. Of this figure, half had been on the waitlist for six months or longer, 1569 had been waiting for at least a year, and 72 have been waiting for two years or more.

In mid November 2022, the Government introduced two new bills, the Natural and Built Environment Bill (NBA) and the Spatial Planning Bill (SPA), as part of its efforts to replace the Resource Management Act 1991 (RMA). The NBA replaces the Government's environmental policy statements with a National Planning Framework (NPF). Under the NPF framework, all 15 regions will be required to develop a  Natural and Built Environment Plan (NBE) that will replace the 100 district and regional plans, harmonising consenting and planning rules. An independent national Māori entity will also be established to provide input into the NPF and ensure compliance with the Treaty of Waitangi's provisions. The SSPA  will deal with long-term planning. Local committees will be required to develop 30-year regional spatial strategies (RSS) for regional NBEs. In response, the opposition National and ACT parties criticised the Government's proposed overhaul of the RMA legislation on the grounds that it created more centralisation, bureaucracy, and did little to reform the problems associated with the RMA process. The Green Party expressed concerns about what it perceived as the lack of environment protection in the two bills.

On 25 November, the Government and the Māori iwi/tribe Ngāti Mutunga o Wharekauri concluded an "agreement in principle" to settle historical Treaty of Waitangi claims relating to the annexation of the Chatham Islands in 1842. The agreements includes a financial redress of NZ$13 million, the option to transfer culturally significant lands to the iwi as "cultural redress," and shared redress between the iwi and Moriori.

In response to the 2022 Sandringham dairy stabbing, Ardern and Hipkins announced that the Government would be launching a new retail crime package to combat retail crime including a fog cannon subsidy scheme, a NZ$4 million fund to support local councils' crime prevention programmes, and expanding the existing Retail Crime Prevention Fund eligibility to include aggravated robberies.

On 5 December, Ardern and Verrall formally announced that the Government would be holding a Royal Commission of Inquiry into its COVID-19 pandemic response. The inquiry will be chaired by Australian-based epidemiologist Tony Blakely, former National Party cabinet minister Hekia Parata, and former Treasury secretary John Whitehead. The inquiry is expected to be launched on 1 February 2023 and finish in mid-2024. It will examine the overall pandemic response including the health response, border management, community care, isolation, quarantine, and the economic response including monetary policy. However, it will not examine decisions made by the Reserve Bank of New Zealand's Monetary Policy Committee as well as how government policies applied to individual cases. While epidemiologist Michael Baker welcomed the inquiry as a means of preparing for future pandemics, the Green and National parties regarded the inquiry's scope as too narrow and called for a separate review into its economic impact.

On 7 December 2022, the Government's Water Services Entities Act 2022 passed its third and final reading with the sole support of the Labour Party. While National and ACT opposed the Bill on the grounds it promoted co-governance and centralisation, the Greens and Māori parties rejected the Bill due to its lack of anti-privatisation safeguards and alleged "insufficient" co-governance arrangements.

On 12 December 2022, Ardern and Immigration Minister Michael Wood confirmed that the Government would add nurses and midwives to its immigration green list, making them eligible for immediate residency in New Zealand. In addition, the Government established a temporary residence immigration pathway for bus and truck drivers. Teachers and tradespeople including drain layers and motor mechanics were also added to the work to residence immigration pathway. These changes came in response to a national labour shortage across different sectors in the New Zealand economy caused by emigration and low wages. The Government also confirmed plans to add ten jobs to the green list in March 2023 including gas fitters, drain layers, crane operators, civil machine operators, telecommunication technicians, civil construction supervisors, and halal slaughterers.

On 13 December, the Government's Smokefree Environments and Regulated Products (Smoked Tobacco) Amendment Act 2022 passed its third reading by a margin of 76 to 43 votes. While Labour, the Green, and Māori parties voted in favour of the Bill, it was opposed by the National and ACT parties. Associate-Health Minister Dr. Verrall argued that the legislation would help reduce tobacco harm among young people and the Māori community while National health spokesperson Dr. Reti and ACT Deputy leader Van Velden questioned the effectiveness of the legislation and argued it would cause more harm and crime in the community.

2023
On 13 January, the Emergency Management Minister Kieran McAnulty and Rural Communities Minister Damien O'Connor confirmed that the Government had contributed relief assistance to farmers and communities in the Gisborne District/Tairāwhiti affected by flood damage caused by Cyclone Hale. The Government contributed NZ$150,000 to the Mayoral Relief Fund to help communities in the Gisborne District and another NZ$100,000 to help local farmers and horticulturalists affected by Cyclone Hale.

On 19 January, Ardern confirmed that she would be resigning as Prime Minister and leader of the Labour Party prior to the 2023 New Zealand general election, scheduled for 14 October 2023. She also confirmed that she would be stepping down as MP for the Mount Albert electorate.  Following Ardern's resignation, Chris Hipkins was elected unopposed as the leader of the Labour Party on 21 January. On 22 January, Carmel Sepuloni succeeded Grant Robertson as Deputy Prime Minister. On 25 January, Hipkins and Sepuloni were formally sworn in as Prime Minister and Deputy Prime Minister respectively.

After assuming office, Hipkins announced that the Labour Government would focus on "cost of living" issues such as rising rent, food prices, and building as the "heart of its work program." Hipkins also stated that the COVID-19 pandemic had created an economic crisis, which his Government would focus on. In late January, Hipkins attended a roundtable event organised by the Auckland Business Chamber where he met with Auckland business leaders to discuss issues affecting the business sector including skills shortages, immigration visa settings, wage rises, and dissatisfaction with the Government's Aotearoa New Zealand Public Media merger, Three Waters reform programme, and the social unemployment insurance scheme. 

Following the 2023 North Island floods which devastated Auckland, Hipkins along with Emergency Management Minister McAnulty and Transport Minister Michael Wood visited Auckland to assess the damage, liaise with local authorities and emergency services, reassure affected constituents, and attended a press conference with Mayor of Auckland Wayne Brown. The Government also pledged NZ$100,000 to aid flood relief efforts in Auckland. On 31 January, the Government committed a further NZ$1 million to the Mayoral Relief Fund to assist affected communities in Auckland.

A cabinet reshuffle occurred on 31 January. Andrew Little was replaced as Health Minister by Ayesha Verrall while Michael Wood was assigned the new Minister of Auckland portfolio in response to the 2023 North Island floods. Kieran McAnulty succeeded Nanaia Mahuta as Minister of Local Government. Mahuta herself retained her Foreign Minister portfolio. Jan Tinetti was also appointed as Education Minister and gained the child poverty reduction. Following a cabinet reshuffle that occurred on 31 January 2023, Mahuta lost her Local Government portfolio but retained her foreign affairs portfolio. Ginny Andersen and Barbara Edmonds also joined Hipkins' Cabinet. Andersen assumed the "Digital Economy and Communications, Small Business, and Seniors ministerial portfolios as well as the immigration and Treaty of Waitangi Negotiations associate portfolios. Edmonds assumed the Internal Affairs and Pacific Peoples ministerial portfolio as well as health and housing associate portfolios.

On 1 February, Hipkins announced that the Government would spend $718 million in various "cost of living" support measures including extending the 25 cents per litre fuel excise subsidy until 30 June and half-price public transport fares until June 2023. In addition, discounted fares for 1 million Community Service Card holders and tertiary students would be made permanent from 1 July 2023. These subsidies were intended to address the high national cost of living and the effects of the 2023 North Island floods. 

On 7 February, Hipkins undertook his first overseas state visit to Canberra where he met Australian Prime Minister Anthony Albanese. While the two leaders reaffirmed Australian-New Zealand bilateral relations, they also discussed the controversial Section 501 deportation policy. During the visit, Albanese reiterated that his government would revise the deportation policy to take into account individuals' connections to Australia and the length of time they had lived in the country. In response to the 2023 Turkey–Syria earthquake, Foreign Minister Mahuta announced that New Zealand would be contributing NZ$1.5 million to assisting the International Red Cross and Red Crescent Movement (IFRC) responses in Turkey and Syria. Hipkins also confirmed that New Zealand would be providing humanitarian assistance to those affected by the earthquake.

On 8 February, Hipkins announced that several policies including the proposed TVNZ–Radio New Zealand merger and that a biofuel mandate requiring petrol and diesel to source a certain percentage of biofuel from renewable resources would be scrapped. In addition, Hipkins confirmed that other policies including the social income insurance scheme, proposed hate speech legislation, and the controversial Three Waters reform programme would be delayed or revised. Hipkins also confirmed that the minimum wage would be raised from NZ$21.20 to NZ$22.70 an hour from 1 April 2023. In response to the recent North Island floods, Hipkins conformed that the Government would invest NZ$3 million in discretionary flood recovery payments, NZ$1 million in supporting flood-affected businesses, and NZ$1 million in mental health support.

On 13 February, Hipkins announced a NZ$11.5m aid package in response to storm damage caused by Cyclone Gabrielle. The following day, the Minister of Emergency Management McAnulty declared a national state of emergency over the Northland, Auckland, Tairawhiti, Bay of Plenty, Waikato and Hawke's Bay regions; the third time a state of emergency had been declared over the country. This state of emergency allows for a national coordination of the clean-up response, provide additional resources to affected individuals, and empowers the Government to respond to dangerous situations including restricting travel.

On 23 February, the Government ordered a ministerial inquiry into forestry companies' slash practices particularly the stockpiling of discarded branches and "offcuts," which had exacerbated flood damage caused by Cyclone Gabrielle. The inquiry will be led by former National Party cabinet minister Hekia Parata, former Hawke's Bay Regional Council chief executive Bill Bayfield, and forestry engineer Matthew McCloy. Several political and civil society leaders including National Party leader Luxon, the Forest Owners Association President Don Carson, Green Party co-leader Shaw and fellow Green MP Eugenie Sage, and Forestry Minister Stuart Nash supported calls for an inquiry into the forestry industry's practices and accountability from forestry companies.

On 13 March, Hipkins announced that the Government would be scrapping several policies and reform programmes including legislation to lower the voting age to 16 years, the speed reduction programme except for the most dangerous 1% of highways, and the NZ$586 million Clean Car Upgrade programme. In addition, the Government announced that it would delay or scale-back several policies and programmes including proposed alcohol reforms, the container return scheme, public transportation including the Auckland Light Rail, and public consultation on a new test to determine the difference between contractors and employees. The Government would redirect funding to a NZ$2 billion to a welfare package to provide "bread and butter" support to 1.4 million New Zealanders affected by the ongoing "cost of living" crisis. In response, Green Party co-leader and Climate Change Minister James Shaw  expressed disappointment with cutbacks of climate action policies such as the Clear Car Upgrade during the so-called "policy bonfire." Meanwhile, Māori Party leader Debbie Ngarewa-Packer expressed concerned with the Government's abandonment of several climate change policies and urged Shaw to resign as Climate Change Minister. The opposition National Party leader Christopher Luxon and deputy leader Nicola Willis welcomed the Government's decision to scrap so-called "wasteful" and "unpopular" policies but urged the Government to reduce spending and taxation. ACT Party leader David Seymour argued that New Zealanders needed a change in government and stated "that Hipkins U-turning on a tiny handful of policies isn't fooling anyone."

Election results
The following table shows the total party votes and seats in Parliament won by Labour, plus any parties supporting a Labour-led government in coalition or with confidence and supply.

Significant policies and initiatives

Economic development, science and innovation

 Established a $1 billion Regional Development Fund
 Introduced a wage subsidy scheme for all workers unable to attend work during the nationwide lockdown resulting from COVID-19. This was later extended until October 2020.
 Interest-free loans were introduced for businesses as part of a package of economic policies in response to COVID-19

Education and workforce
 Abolished 90 day trials for larger firms
 Made the first year of tertiary education or training free from 1 January 2018
 Increased student allowances and living costs loans by $50 a week effective 1 January 2018
 Scrapped both National Standards for literacy and numeracy and primary school league tables
 Free driver training for all secondary school students
 Decile 1-7 schools were offered extra funding if boards chose to scrap voluntary donations
 Raised the minimum wage to $16.50 an hour in 2018, $18.90 in 2020, and $20.00 in 2021, representing and overall increase of around 6% per year
 Abolished NCEA fees
 Established the Pike River Recovery Agency with an accompanying ministerial portofolio plus a commitment by minister Andrew Little to re-enter Pike River Mine
 New Mana in Mahi program introduced to encourage employers, through wage subsidies, to take on young beneficiaries
 Signed a pay equity deal with education support workers to increase pay by 30%
 Pay for early childhood education workers was boosted in 2020, with the government increasing education and care services' subsidy rates
 Apprenticeship fees were scrapped from 1 July 2020 as a response to the economic downturn resulting from COVID-19
 Paid sick leave was doubled from five days to ten per year

Environment
 Hold a Clean Waters Summit to examine water and lake pollution
 Established a Zero-Carbon Act with the goal of net zero emissions of carbon dioxide by 2050
 Established an independent Climate Change Commission
 Set a target of planting one billion trees over the next ten years
 Re-established the New Zealand Forest Service
 Ceased tendering any new off-shore oil and gas exploration permits
 Phased out single-use plastic bags

Finance and expenditure
 Cancelled the previous National Government's proposed tax cuts
 Established a Tax Working Group
 Fuel tax excise was increased, and local governments were enabled to charge regional fuel taxes. In 2022 in response to increasing inflation the fuel excise was cut by 25 cents, road user charges were reduced and public transport fares halved
 Rolling increases to tobacco excise, in place since 2010, were cancelled in 2020
 The top rate of income tax was raised from 33% to 39% for those earning over $180,000 from 1 April 2021

Foreign affairs, defence and trade

 Announced plans to initiate a Closer Commonwealth Economic Relations (CCER) agreement with the UK, Australia, Canada and other Commonwealth countries
 Announced plans to reopen trade talks with Russia (as part of the Labour–NZ First agreement). These talks were suspended in response to the poisoning of Sergei and Yulia Skripal
 A shift from a "donor, recipient" relationship to a partnership–based relationship with Pacific Island states was commenced
 Plans to ratify the Comprehensive and Progressive Agreement for Trans-Pacific Partnership
 Ratified the Global Compact for Migration
 Defence spending was significantly increased in the 2019 budget

Governance and administration

 Establish and appoint a person to the Government's new Chief Technology Officer (CTO)
 Removed the ability for local government to impose height limits of less than six stories, and ended minimum car park requirements

Health
 Centralized all 20 District health boards into one national public health service, Te Whatu Ora - Health New Zealand, as well as establishing the Te Aka Whai Ora - the Māori Health Authority
 Established a ministerial inquiry into mental health
 Introduced legislation to legalise medical cannabis
 Free doctors' visits for all under-14's was introduced
 Re-established the Mental Health Commission
 Plan to rebuild the Dunedin Hospital by 2026
 Announced a pilot programme for free counselling for young adults
 Signed a pay equity deal for mental health and addiction support workers
 A bill banning smoking in cars with children present was passed
 A plan to provide free female sanitary products in secondary schools by 2021 was initiated
 Pill testing at summer festivals was legalised

Housing

 Passed the Healthy Homes Guarantee Act 2017, requiring all rental homes to be warm and dry
 Extended the bright-line test, which requires tax to be paid on the increase in value of a property resold within a given period, to five years. Later extended further to ten years.
 Restricted foreigners (with the exception of Australian citizens) from buying existing residential homes
 Ceased the sale of state houses
 Established an Affordable Housing Authority and implemented the KiwiBuild programme
 Comprehensive register of foreign-owned land and housing established
 A rent-to-own scheme as part of KiwiBuild
 Building consents for low risk projects, such as garden sheds and sleepouts, were scrapped.
 Legislation improving rights for renters was passed, which included rent increases being limited to once per year. No cause evictions were also scrapped.
 A shared ownership scheme with Kāinga Ora was introduced to assist first home buyers.

Immigration
 Reduce net immigration by 20,000–30,000 a year. Ardern later said there would be no immediate cut to immigration
 Creating a special refugee visa category to resettle Pacific Islanders displaced by climate change
 The refugee resettlement quota was increased, which met a longstanding commitment to the double the quota refugee advocacy campaign
 Temporarily closed national borders to all non-residents during the COVID-19 pandemic in New Zealand

Justice
 Held a referendum on legalising recreational cannabis use
 Passed a law allowing survivors of domestic violence 10 days paid leave from work
 Allowed men convicted of historic crimes relating to consensual homosexual sex to have their records expunged
 Removed abortion from the Crimes Act via the Abortion Legislation Act 2020
 Reinstated the right of prisoners, serving less than a three-year sentence, to vote in elections
 Banned the practice of conversion therapy on LGBT persons under the age of 18

Māori affairs
 Commit to a target that by 2025 that every student from ECE, Primary, Intermediate and Secondary has Te Reo Māori integrated into their learning
 Secondary schools give students the chance to choose Te Reo Māori as a main subject
 Ensure that all early childhood, primary school, and intermediate school teachers are provided with an opportunity to undertake lessons in Te Reo Māori
 Provide dedicated scholarships to increase the number of Te Reo Māori teachers and ensure that Te Reo Māori is available as an option in all secondary schools

Primary production
 Announced plans for a royalty on exports of bottled waters
 Divided the Ministry for Primary Industries into separate agriculture, forestry, and fishing departments
 Reduced public funding for irrigation projects while subsidising existing projects in early April 2018

Social services and community
 Legislated to introduce the Families Package (including Winter Energy Payment, Best Start, and increases to paid parental leave)
 Resumed funding to the New Zealand Superannuation Fund to keep the retirement age at 65
 The Family Tax Credit, Orphans Benefit, Accommodation Supplement, and Foster Care Allowance were all substantially increased as part of Labour's Families Package
 Introduced legislation to set a child poverty reduction target
 Established a Royal Commission of Inquiry into Historical Abuse in State Care
 Introduced a new generation SuperGold smart card with entitlements and concessions
 Removed some "excessive" benefit sanctions
 Set a target to eliminate the gender pay gap within the public sector
 A lunch programme was introduced for low decile schools.
Welfare benefits were increased in response to COVID-19 and the Winter Energy Payment was temporarily doubled
Funding for sexual and domestic violence services was significantly increased
 Increased main benefits by $25 per week effective from 1 April 2020.
 A weekly tax-free "income relief" payment was introduced for workers made redundant during the economic fall out of COVID-19.
 Social security benefits were indexed to wages instead of the Consumer Price Index, this would double the amount of benefit dependent persons would have otherwise received without wage indexation
 Increased abatement thresholds from $90 per week to $160 before social security benefits are abated.
 The 2021 budget substantially raised benefits, between $32 to $55 per week, for persons dependent on social security payments and will be fully implemented by April 2022.
 Passed an amendment to the Births, Deaths, Marriages and Relationships Act making self-identification easier by removing the requirement for transgender New Zealanders to provide medical proof of medical treatment or a Family Court declaration before sex can be changed on a birth certificate.

Transport and infrastructure
 Re-allocated spending towards rail and cycling infrastructure, and road safety improvements
 Announced plans to reestablish light rail to Auckland Airport and to West Auckland
 Commuter rail in 18 months to Hamilton
 Commuter rail to Hamilton and Tauranga
 Commuter rail for Christchurch
 Retain the Capital Connection from Palmerston North to Wellington
 Funding for irrigation projects was reduced
 Wairoa to Napier rail line reinstated
 Feasibility study of moving the Port of Auckland to Northport, Whangarei, and upgrades of road and rail to Northport; as part of Labour-NZ First agreement
 $12 billion was set aside to invest in the 'New Zealand Upgrade Programme', providing funding for infrastructure projects

Controversies

2018 Labour Party youth camp sexual assaults
On 12 March 2018, allegations of multiple sexual assaults at the Young Labour Summer School at Waitawheta Camp in Waihi emerged. It was alleged that a 20-year-old man put his hands down the pants of four sixteen-year-olds on the second night of the camp, which occurred a month earlier. It was reported that there were "mountains of alcohol" present at the camp, and that people under the legal drinking age of eighteen were consuming alcohol. Prime Minister Jacinda Ardern was not informed of the allegations by party leadership, despite them knowing a month earlier. Support had not been offered to the victims, something Ardern said she was "deeply sorry" for. Ardern did not fire any of her party staffers who failed to act on information of the allegations and inform her. Former Prime Minister of the Fifth Labour Government Helen Clark criticised this response, saying "heads would have rolled" if she was at the helm.

In late November 2019, the man, who had pleaded guilty to two charges of indecent assault, was discharged without conviction. In response, one of the male victims expressed disappointment with the court decision, stating that they had lost faith in the justice system.

Ministerial resignations
On 24 May 2018, Transport Minister Phil Twyford resigned from his Civil Aviation portfolio after making an unauthorised phone call on a domestic flight as the plane was taking off, a violation of civil aviation laws. The matter had been raised by Opposition Transport spokesperson Judith Collins.

On 24 August, Prime Minister Jacinda Ardern announced the removal of Clare Curran from Cabinet, and stripped her of her Open Government and Government Digital Services porfolios. These were reassigned to Education Minister Chris Hipkins and Energy and Resources Minister Megan Woods respectively. Curran's sacking was the result of her failure to disclose that she had held informal meetings with entrepreneur Derek Handley in November 2017 and February 2018, which could have created potential conflicts of interest. After a poor performance while answering a question from National's spokesperson for Broadcasting Melissa Lee during Question Time, Curran announced that she was stepping down as Minister for Broadcasting. She was to remain as MP for Dunedin-South, and Kris Faafoi resumed her Broadcasting portfolio.

On 30 August 2018, Customs Minister Meka Whaitiri "stood aside" from her ministerial portfolios as part of an investigation into an allegation that she assaulted a staff member in her ministerial office. Prime Minister Jacinda Ardern announced that Ministerial Services was investigating the allegations. Fellow Labour MP Kris Faafoi assumed the role of Acting Minister of Customs while her associate ministerial portfolios were assumed by their lead ministers. On 20 September 2018, Ardern announced that she had fired Whaitiri from all of her ministerial portfolios. Ardern said that while aspects of the incident were disputed by Whaitiri, an incident involving Whaitiri manhandling and bullying a new staff member "undoubtedly took place". Kris Faafoi took over her portfolio of Customs. Whaitiri is to remain as the MP for Ikaroa-Rawhiti.

Karel Sroubek
In late October and early November 2018, the Immigration Minister Iain Lees-Galloway drew criticism from the opposition National Party for his decision to grant residency to the convicted Czech drug smuggler Karel Sroubek. It subsequently emerged that Sroubek had a lengthy criminal record in both the Czech Republic and New Zealand. The case also attracted considerable media interest in New Zealand and led the Czech government to announce that it would seek Sroubek's extradition. In mid-December 2018, Lees-Galloway attributed his decision to grant Sroubek residency to incomplete information provided by Immigration New Zealand about Sroubek's criminal record.

2019 Labour sexual assault allegations
In early August 2019, several reports emerged about allegations of bullying, sexual harassment, and resignations from the Labour Party. Media were told that the formal complaints did not involve sexual assaults. On 9 September, the online media outlet The Spinoff published an exclusive report by a 19-year-old female Labour Party volunteer alleging that she had been sexually assaulted by a Labour Party staffer. In response to the report, Prime Minister Ardern said that she was repeatedly told by Labour that the complaint was not about sexual assault and that a review by Maria Dew QC will clear up the contradictory claims. The woman has stood by her claims while Labour Party President Nigel Haworth defended his handling of the complaints process.

On 11 September, Haworth resigned as Labour Party President following criticism of his handling of the complaints about the male staffer from several Labour Party members including bullying, harassment, and sexual assault. Earlier investigations had exonerated the man of these various claims. These sexual assault allegations attracted coverage from several international media including the AFP, The Washington Post, Seven News, The Times, and The Sydney Morning Herald.
That same day, the National Party's deputy leader Paula Bennett claimed under parliamentary privilege that several of the Prime Minister's senior staff members and a Cabinet minister including Ardern's former chief of staff Mike Munro, current chief press secretary Andrew Campbell, and the director of the Labour leader's office Rob Salmond were aware of the sexual allegations.

On 12 September, the male Labour staffer accused of bullying and sexual assault resigned. He stated that he was cooperating with the Dew Inquiry and denied the allegations against him. On 16 September, Prime Minister Ardern announced that Labour would be holding a second inquiry into its response to the sexual assault allegations made against the staffer. Simon Mitchell, the lawyer tasked with leading Labour's investigation into the misconduct, stated that he was unaware of the sexual assault allegations until they were first reported by the media. National Party deputy leader Bennett claimed that the proposed inquiry did not go far enough and alleged that Finance Minister Grant Robertson had been aware of the sexual assault allegations as early as June 2019.

On 18 December, Labour Party President Claire Szabo released the report by Maria Dew QC. While Dew's report found insufficient evidence to support allegations of sexual assault and harassment,  it found that the former Labour Party staffer had shown "overbearing and aggressive" behaviour on five occasions. Dew recommended a letter cautioning the former staffer and that he write a letter of apology and participate in a restorative justice process with the victim.

Shane Jones
In November 2019, Infrastructure Minister  and NZ First MP Shane Jones claimed Indian arranged marriages to be a sham and not adhering to the New Zealand way of life. His comments, described as racist, went unchallenged from the Labour cabinet ministers. He also claimed that arranged marriage partners' visa rules would not apply anymore following changes to the immigration rules. Following a protest in Auckland, Immigration Minister Iain Lees-Galloway explained that immigration rules on arranged marriages were unchanged and clarified the misinformation provided by Shane Jones. Jones made further inflammatory comments against Indian students in January 2020.

Kris Faafoi
In December 2019, Broadcasting Minister Kris Faafoi was criticised after offering to speed up an immigration visa application for Opshop singer Jason Kerrison's father. Opposition Leader Simon Bridges claimed that Faafoi's actions if proven constituted a conflict of interest that breached Cabinet rules. Faafoi subsequently apologised to Prime Minister Ardern.

David Clark
In early April 2020, Health Minister David Clark drew widespread criticism when he flouted the level four lockdown restrictions during the COVID-19 pandemic in New Zealand on two occasions. This included driving two kilometres away from his home in Dunedin to ride a mountain bike trail and later driving his family 20 kilometres to a Dunedin beach for a family outing during the first week of the lockdown. After admitting to the two incidents on separate occasions, Clark offered his resignation as Health Minister to Prime Minister Ardern. Ardern declined to accept his resignation but stripped him of his Associate Finance Ministerial portfolio and demoted him to the bottom of Labour's Cabinet list.

However, Clark subsequently resigned on 2 July, and was replaced in Health by Chris Hipkins while Housing Minister Megan Woods assumed responsibility for Border Management.

List of executive members

On 20 October, Jacinda Ardern announced that the Cabinet would consist of 20 members, of which 16 would be from the Labour Party and 4 from New Zealand First. A further five Labour MPs would sit outside of Cabinet, along with three Green MPs. On 27 June 2019, a cabinet reshuffle occurred.

On 2 November 2020, after the 2020 election, a new cabinet reflective of the Labour majority was announced. It was sworn in on 6 November 2020. On 14 June 2022, a cabinet reshuffle occurred.

Chris Hipkins succeeded Ardern as prime minister on 25 January 2023 and a minor cabinet reshuffle occurred to reallocate Ardern's and Hipkins' previous portfolios, as well as the appointment of Carmel Sepuloni as deputy prime minister. Hipkins announced a wider reshuffle of portfolios the following week, on 31 January.

Ministers

Under-Secretaries & Private Secretaries

References

2017 establishments in New Zealand
Cabinets established in 2017
2010s in New Zealand
2020s in New Zealand
Labour Government of New Zealand
Labour 6
Coalition governments
Ministries of Elizabeth II
Ministries of Charles III
New Zealand First
New Zealand Labour Party
Jacinda Ardern
Chris Hipkins